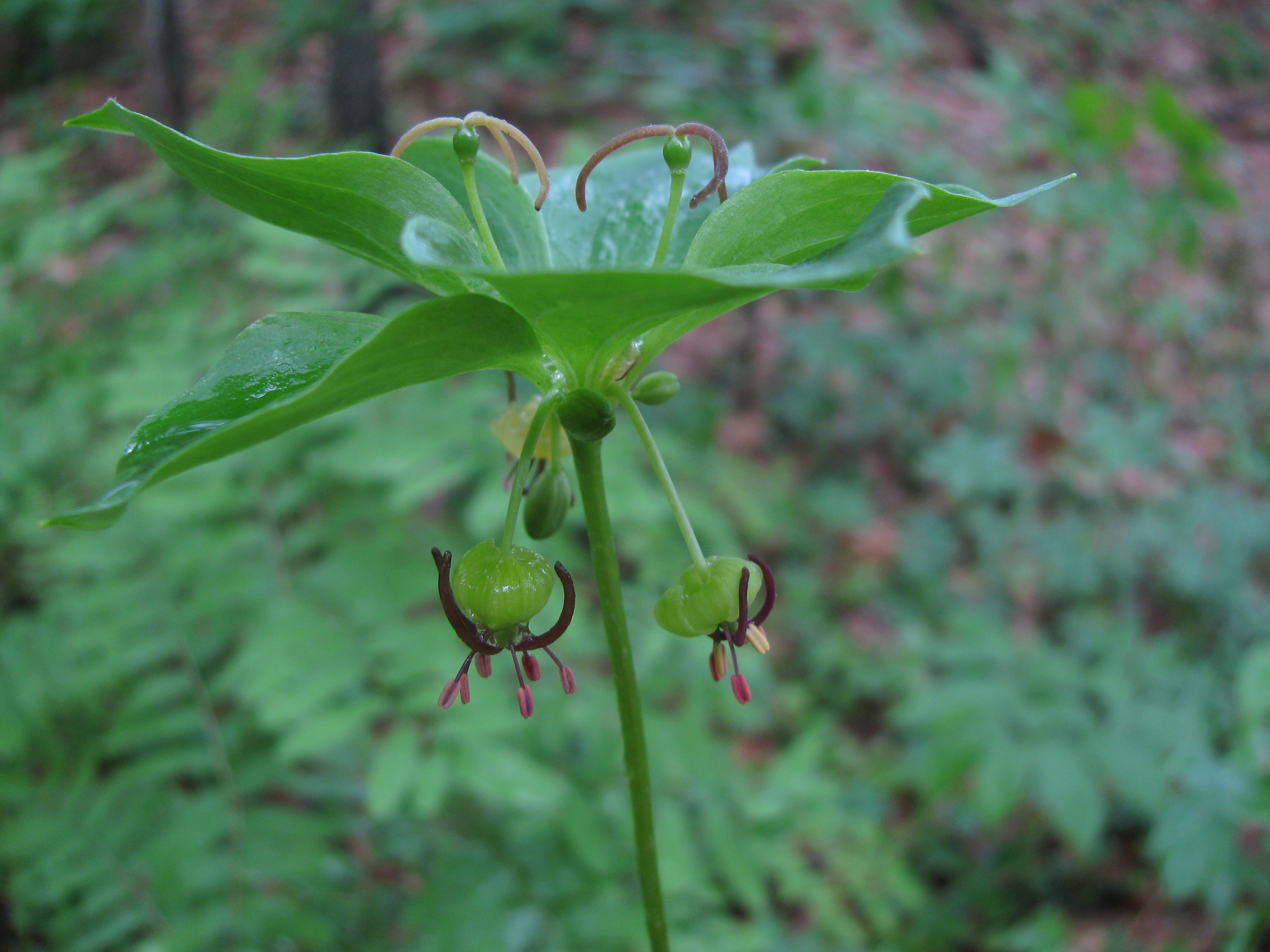
- Medeola virginiana

Scientific classification
- Kingdom: Plantae
- Clade: Embryophytes
- Clade: Tracheophytes
- Clade: Spermatophytes
- Clade: Angiosperms
- Clade: Monocots
- Order: Liliales
- Family: Liliaceae
- Subfamily: Medeoloideae; Benth.

Synonyms
- Medeoleae Benth.

= Medeoloideae =

Subfamily of flowering plants

The Medeoloideae (syn. Medeoleae) are a subfamily of monocotyledon perennial, herbaceous mainly bulbous flowering plants in the lily family, Liliaceae.

== Description ==
The Medeoleae are characterised by rhizomatous stems, inconspicuous flowers, the formation of berries that are animal dispersed and broad reticulate-veined leaves.

== Taxonomy ==
In the most recent taxonomy of the AP Web system, this subfamily has been downgraded to a tribe, Medeoleae, within the subfamily Lilioideae.

The taxon includes two genera;

| Image | Genus | Species |
|---|---|---|
| | Clintonia Raf. | Clintonia andrewsiana Torr.; Clintonia borealis (Aiton) Raf.; Clintonia udensis Trautv. & C.A.Mey.; Clintonia umbellulata (Michx.) Morong; Clintonia uniflora (Menzies ex Schult. & Schult.f.) Kunth |
| | Medeola L. | Medeola virginiana |
