= Naked Lady (disambiguation) =

Naked Lady is the common name of several plants.

Naked Lady or Naked Ladies may also refer to:

- The Naked Ladies, a statue complex in Twickenham, England
- "The Naked Lady", a popular nickname for La Délivrance, a 1914 bronze statue in London
- "The Naked Lady", a nickname for the statue Forest Idyl located at Ball State University in Indiana, US
- "Naked Lady", a story by Mindret Lord in the 1941 anthology The Other Worlds
- "Naked Ladies", a story by Antonya Nelson in The Best American Short Stories 1993
- Naked Ladies, a 1994 novel by Alma Luz Villanueva
- The Naked Lady, a 2002 book by Canadian illustrator and writer Ian Wallace
- "Naked Lady", a track on the 1991 album Night of the Corn People by The Bags

== See also ==
- Barenaked Ladies, a Canadian alternative rock band
- Purple Naked Ladies, a 2011 album by American soul band The Internet
- What Do You Say to a Naked Lady?, a 1970 American hidden-camera style reality film
- Female nudity
