= List of plants known as bluebead =

The word bluebead is used in the common name for each of several species of flowering plants in the genus Clintonia, including:

- Clintonia andrewsiana, the western bluebead lily
- Clintonia borealis, the bluebead lily
- Clintonia uniflora, the blue-bead lily, or simply the blue bead

== See also ==
- Bluebeam
- Bluebeard (disambiguation)
- Bluebeat (disambiguation)
