= Bags (disambiguation) =

Bags is the plural of bag.

Bags or The Bags may also refer to:

== Nickname ==
- Jeff Bagwell (born 1968), American retired Major League Baseball player
- Milt Jackson (1923–1999), American jazz vibraphonist

== Music ==
- Bags (Los Angeles band), a punk rock band formed in the 1970s
- The Bags (Massachusetts band), a hard rock band formed in the 1980s
  - The Bags (album), released in 2008
- "Bags" (song), a song by Clairo

== Other uses ==
- Periorbital puffiness, swelling around the eyes
- "Bags", the first episode of the seventh season of Weeds
- Target Toss Pro: Bags, an arcade video game
- Cornhole, a game commonly referred to as bags
- Oxford bags, a form of baggy trousers originating from the University of Oxford
