= Resurrection lily =

Resurrection lily may refer to:

- Lycoris squamigera, a plant in the amaryllis family, Amaryllidaceae
- Kaempferia galanga, a plant in the ginger family, Zingiberaceae
