= List of plants known as lily =

Lily usually refers to herbaceous plants of the genus Lilium, with large showy trumpet-shaped flowers. Many species are cultivated as ornamentals.

Many other plants not closely related to lilies are called lilies, usually because their flowers resemble lilies. They include:

- African lily, Agapanthus africanus
- Amazon lily, Eucharis species
- Arum lily, Araceae, Zantedeschia species
- Autumn zephyrlily, Zephyranthes candida
- Aztec lily, Sprekelia species
- Bead lily:
  - Clintonia
  - Clintonia andrewsiana
  - Clintonia borealis
  - Clintonia uniflora
- Belladonna lily, Amaryllis
- Blackberry lily, Belamcanda
- Blood lily:
  - Haemanthus
  - Scadoxus
- Blue lily:
  - Agapanthus praecox
  - Nymphaea caerulea
  - Nymphaea violacea
  - Stypandra glauca (nodding blue lily)
  - Thelionema caespitosum (tufted blue lily)
  - Triteleia grandiflora
- Bluebead lily:
  - Clintonia
  - Clintonia andrewsiana
  - Clintonia borealis
  - Clintonia uniflora
- Bonnet lily, Nuphar
- Bugle lily, Watsonia
- Bush lily, Clivia species
- Calla lily, Zantedeschia aethiopica
- Candelabra lily, Brunsvigia josephinae
- Chocolate lily:
  - Dichopogon strictus
  - Fritillaria biflora
  - Fritillaria camschatcensis
  - Fritillaria lanceolata
- Clinton's lily, Clintonia
- Cobra lily:
  - Arisaema species
  - Darlingtonia californica
- Copperlily, Habranthus species
- Corn lily:
  - Clintonia borealis
  - Ixia
  - Veratrum
- Cornish lily, Nerine bowdenii
- Crimson flag lily, Hesperantha coccinea
- Daylily (or Day lily), Hemerocallis
- Fawn lily, Erythronium
- Flag lily, Hesperantha species
- Flax lily:
  - Dianella (plant)
  - Phormium
- Forest lily, Veltheimia bracteata
- Fortnight lily, Dietes bicolor
- Foxtail lily, Eremurus robustus
- Fringe lily, Thysanotus
- Giant Himalayan lily, Cardiocrinum giganteum
- Giant spear lily, Doryanthes palmeri
- Ginger lily:
  - Alpinia
  - Hedychium
- Guernsey lily:
  - Nerine bowdenii
  - Nerine sarniensis
- Gymea lily, Doryanthes excelsa
- Hedgehog lily, Massonia depressa
- Henderson's fawn lily, Erythronium hendersonii
- Himalayan cobra lily, Arisaema consanguineum
- Jacobean lily, Sprekelia species
- Jersey lily, Amaryllis belladonna
- Josephine's lily, Brunsvigia josephinae
- Kaffir lily:
  - Clivia miniata
  - Hesperantha coccinea
- Lent lily, the wild daffodil Narcissus pseudonarcissus
- Lily of the Incas, Alstroemeria psittacina
- Lily of the Nile, Agapanthus praecox
- Lily of the valley, Convallaria majalis
- Mariposa lily, Calochortus
- Natal lily, Clivia miniata
- Nodding blue lily, Stypandra glauca
- Paintbrush lily, Haemanthus coccineus
- Palm lily, Cordyline rubra
- Paradise lily, Paradisea
- Parrot lily, Alstroemeria psittacina
- Peace lily, Spathiphyllum
- Peruvian lily, Alstroemeria
- Peruvian swamp lily, Zephyranthes candida
- Pineapple lily, Eucomis
- Pink lily leek, Allium oreophilum
- Pond lily, Nuphar
- Rain lily:
  - Habranthus
  - Cooperia
  - Zephyranthes
- Resurrection lily, Lycoris squamigera
- River lily:
  - Crinum pedunculatum
  - Hesperantha coccinea
- St. Bernard's lily, Anthericum liliago
- St. Bruno's lily, Paradisea liliastrum
- Sand lily:
  - Leucocrinum
  - Pancratium maritimum
  - Veltheimia capensis
- Scarborough lily, Cyrtanthus elatus
- Sego lily, Calochortus nuttallii
- Siberian fawn lily, Erythronium sibiricum
- Spear lily, Doryanthes palmeri
- Speckled wood-lily, Clintonia umbellulata
- Spider lily:
  - Crinum
  - Hymenocallis
  - Lycoris (plant)
- Spoon lily, Alocasia brisbanensis
- Star lily:
  - Leucocrinum
- Surprise lily, Lycoris squamigera
- Swamp lily, Crinum pedunculatum
- Tasman flax lily, Dianella tasmanica
- Tinsel lily, Calectasia
- Toad lily, Tricyrtis species
- Torch lily, Kniphofia
- Trailing lily, Bomarea multiflora
- Trout lily, Erythronium
- Tufted blue lily, Thelionema caespitosum
- Vanilla lily, Arthropodium
- Water lily or waterlily:
  - Nymphaea
  - Nymphaeaceae
- White rain lily, Zephyranthes candida
- Yellow trout lily, Erythronium americanum

== Classification ==
Darlingtonia californica is a eudicot. Nuphar and Nymphaea are genera in the Nymphaeaceae family of order Nymphaeales, and are basal angiosperms. All other plants listed here are monocots.
