= Rock Starve =

Studio album by The Bags
- Released: November 1987
- Genre: Hard rock, punk rock
- Length: 40:19
- Label: Restless Records
- Producer: Steve Barry; Steve Buzz Magner

The Bags chronology
| Rock Starve (1987) | Swamp Oaf (1989) |

Rock Starve is The Bags' debut album, released in 1987 by Restless Records.

Though preceded by early releases of "Try It" and "Egg" — songs found on the multiple-artist compilation, Crawling from Within — the album features re-recorded versions.

== Critical reception ==
Billboard recommended the album, writing that the band "mashes up a more than acceptable brand of home-brewed thrash on its palpitating debut disk." Trouser Press wrote that "the Bags demonstrate a singular ability to analyze and describe relationships and emotions with searing but subtle simplicity ... The album doesn’t contain a bad tune."

== Track listing ==
| No. | Title | Length |
|---|---|---|
| 1. | "Spread it Around" | 3:07 |
| 2. | "Pioneer" | 2:53 |
| 3. | "Warm Words" | 2:45 |
| 4. | "What Do You Want?" | 2:14 |
| 5. | "She's Beautiful" | 1:46 |
| 6. | "Out of My Mind" | 2:32 |
| 7. | "Try It" | 1:56 |
| 8. | "Tailbone" | 2:01 |
| 9. | "Joy Ride" | 2:53 |
| 10. | "Flying Low" | 3:24 |
| 11. | "Trapped" | 1:28 |
| 12. | "Love Sick Diane" | 3:02 |
| 13. | "Nothing to Say to You" | 2:31 |
| 14. | "Lick My Wounds" | 2:00 |
| 15. | "Egg" | 3:15 |
| 16. | "Big Wig" | 2:32 |
