= Bead lily =

Bead lily is a common name for several flowering plant species in genus Clintonia, including:

- Clintonia andrewsiana, Andrews' bead lily, also known as the red bead lily
- Clintonia borealis, the blue bead-lily
- Clintonia uniflora, the queen's cup bead lily, or simply beadlily
