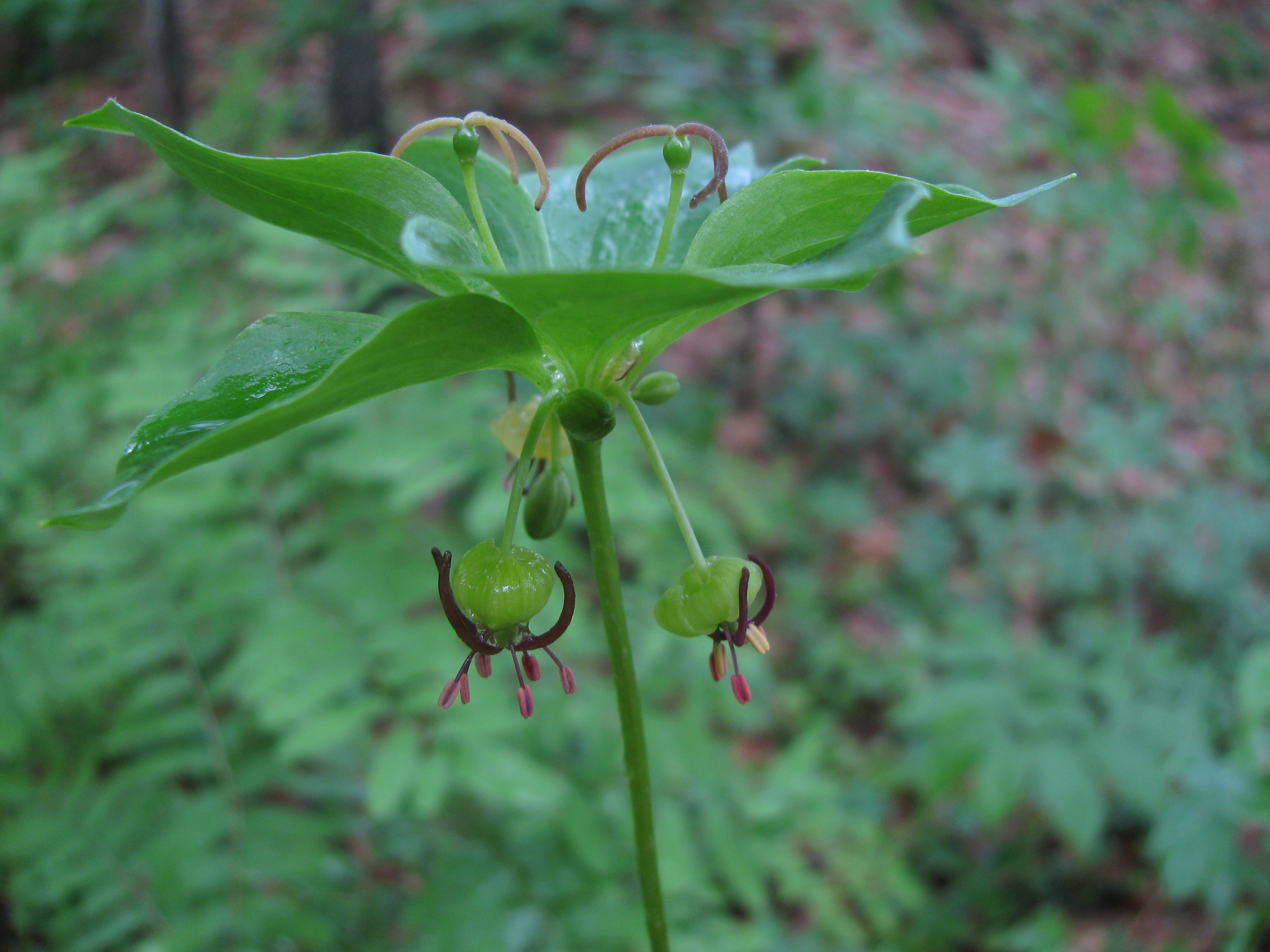
- Flowering

Conservation status
- Secure (NatureServe)

Scientific classification
- Kingdom: Plantae
- Clade: Tracheophytes
- Clade: Angiosperms
- Clade: Monocots
- Order: Liliales
- Family: Liliaceae
- Subfamily: Lilioideae
- Tribe: Medeoleae
- Genus: Medeola; L.
- Species: M. virginiana

Binomial name
- Medeola virginiana L.
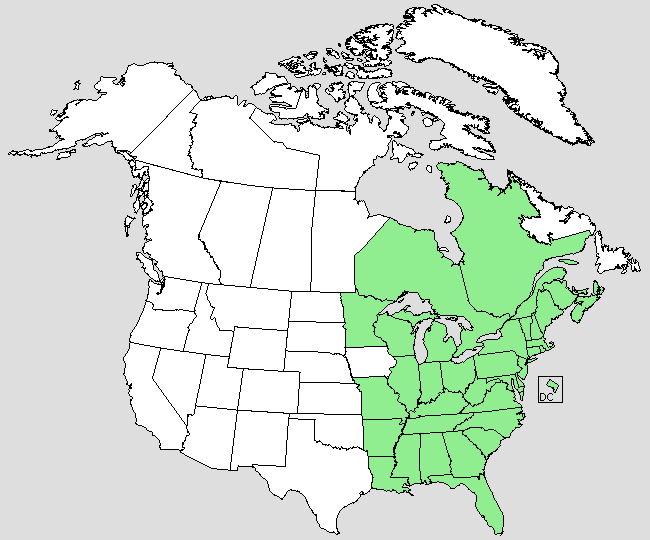
- USDA distribution map

Synonyms
- Gyromia acuminata Raf.; Gyromia cuneata Raf.; Gyromia virginica (Christm.) Nutt.; Gyromia virginica var. picta Nutt.; Medeola verticillifolia Stokes; Medeola virginica Christm.

= Medeola =

Genus of flowering plants

Medeola virginiana, known as Indian cucumber, cucumber root, or Indian cucumber-root, is an eastern North American plant species in the lily family, Liliaceae. It is the only currently recognized plant species in the genus Medeola. It grows in the understory of forests. The plant bears edible rhizomes that have a mild cucumber-like flavor.

== Description ==
Medeola virginiana shoots consist of two tiers of whorled leaves. The lower tier typically bears between five and nine (occasionally up to 12) lance shaped leaves. The upper tier bears three to five ovate leaves. The leaves have an entire (smooth) margin. Some individuals lack a second tier of whorled leaves. The second tier is produced when the plant flowers. When two-tiered, plants grow to 30 in (76 cm) high. The flowers have yellowish green tepals and appear in late spring. The fruit is a dark blue to purple, inedible berry above the top tier of leaves. Indian cucumber-root shoots arise each spring from an overwintering tuberlike structure. This structure produces a series of horizontal rhizomes at 45 degree angles which produces a clonal colony of plants in an octagonal pattern.

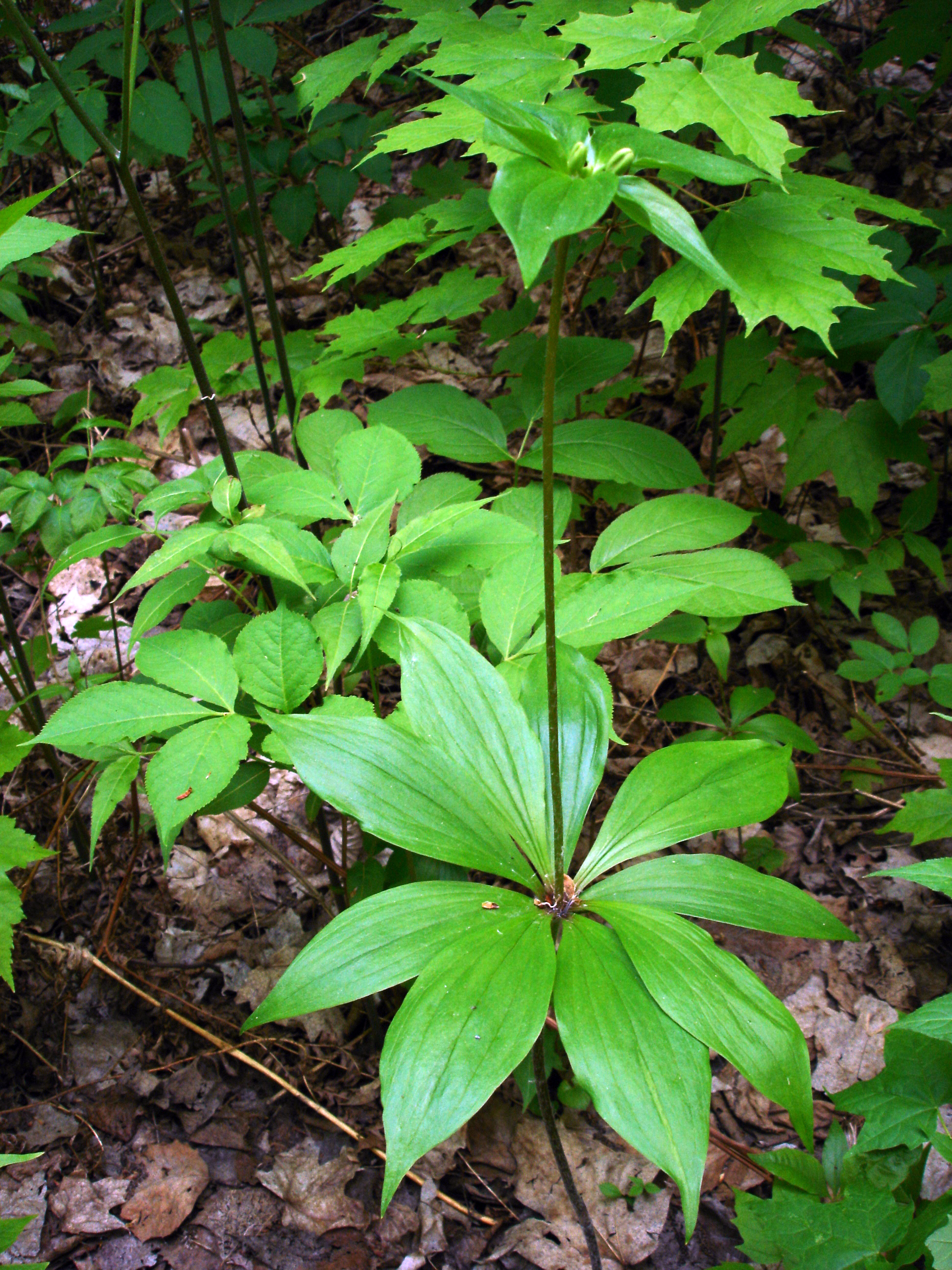
Two tiers of whorled leaves

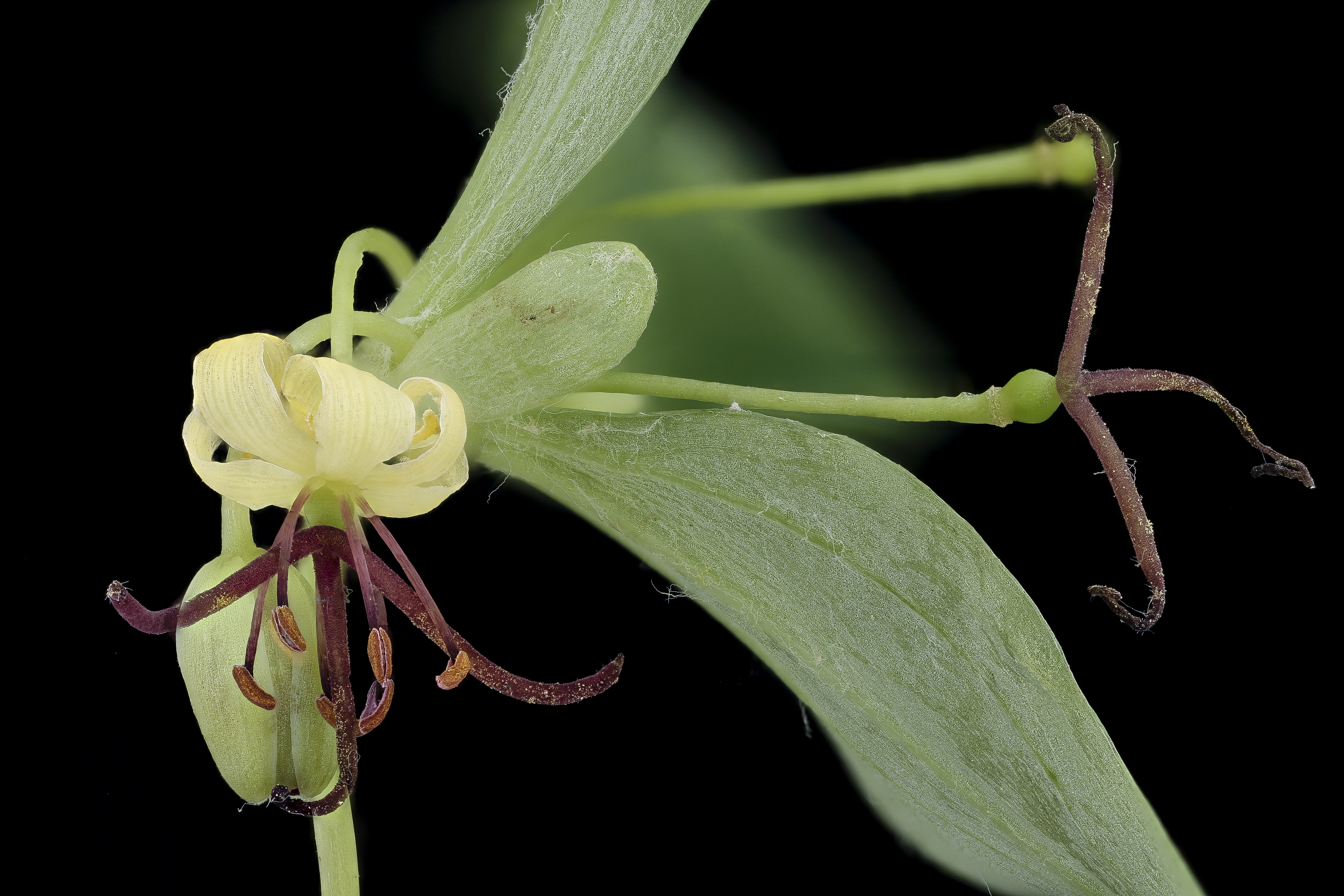
Flowering

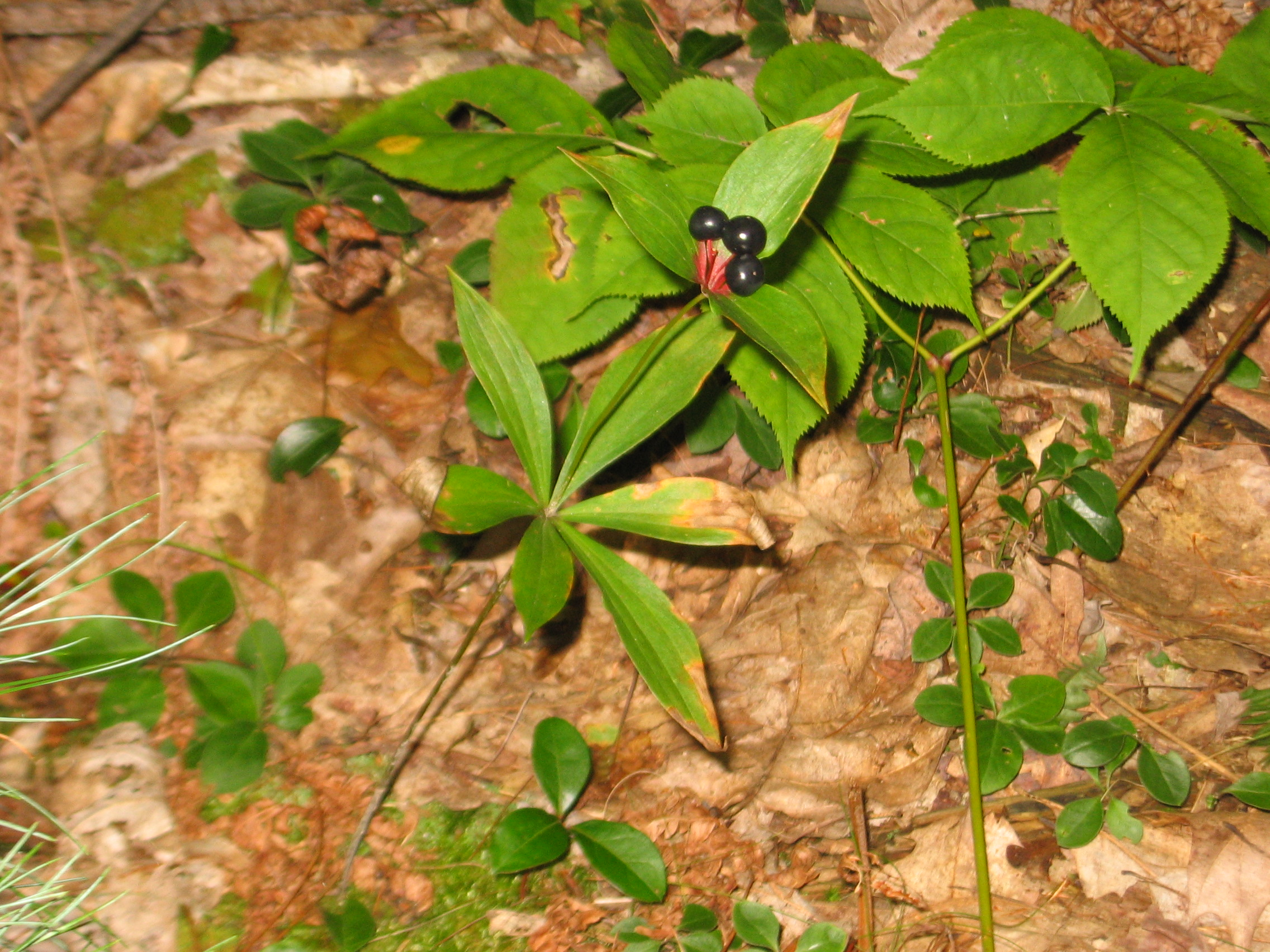
Fruiting

== Taxonomy and systematics ==
The genus Medeola was formerly associated with the lilioid genera Trillium and Paris, which are now placed in the tribe Paridae of the family Melanthiaceae in the order Liliales. Armen Takhtajan separated Medeola from Trillium and Paris, and placed it in its own family, Medeolaceae, which he erected in 1987, based on a description that had been published in 1879 by Sereno Watson. The genera Medeola and Clintonia now constitute the tribe Medeoleae of the subfamily Lilioideae in the family Liliaceae, as narrowly defined in the APG IV system. Molecular, morphological, embryological, and cytological evidence supports a sister relationship between Medeola and Clintonia. The Flora of North America includes both of these in the family Liliaceae.

Some species of Asparagus were formerly placed in the genus Medeola, including:

- Medeola angustifolia now Asparagus asparagoides
- Medeola asparagoides now Asparagus asparagoides
- Medeola latifolia now Asparagus asparagoides
- Medeola triphylla now Asparagus declinatus

== Distribution and habitat ==
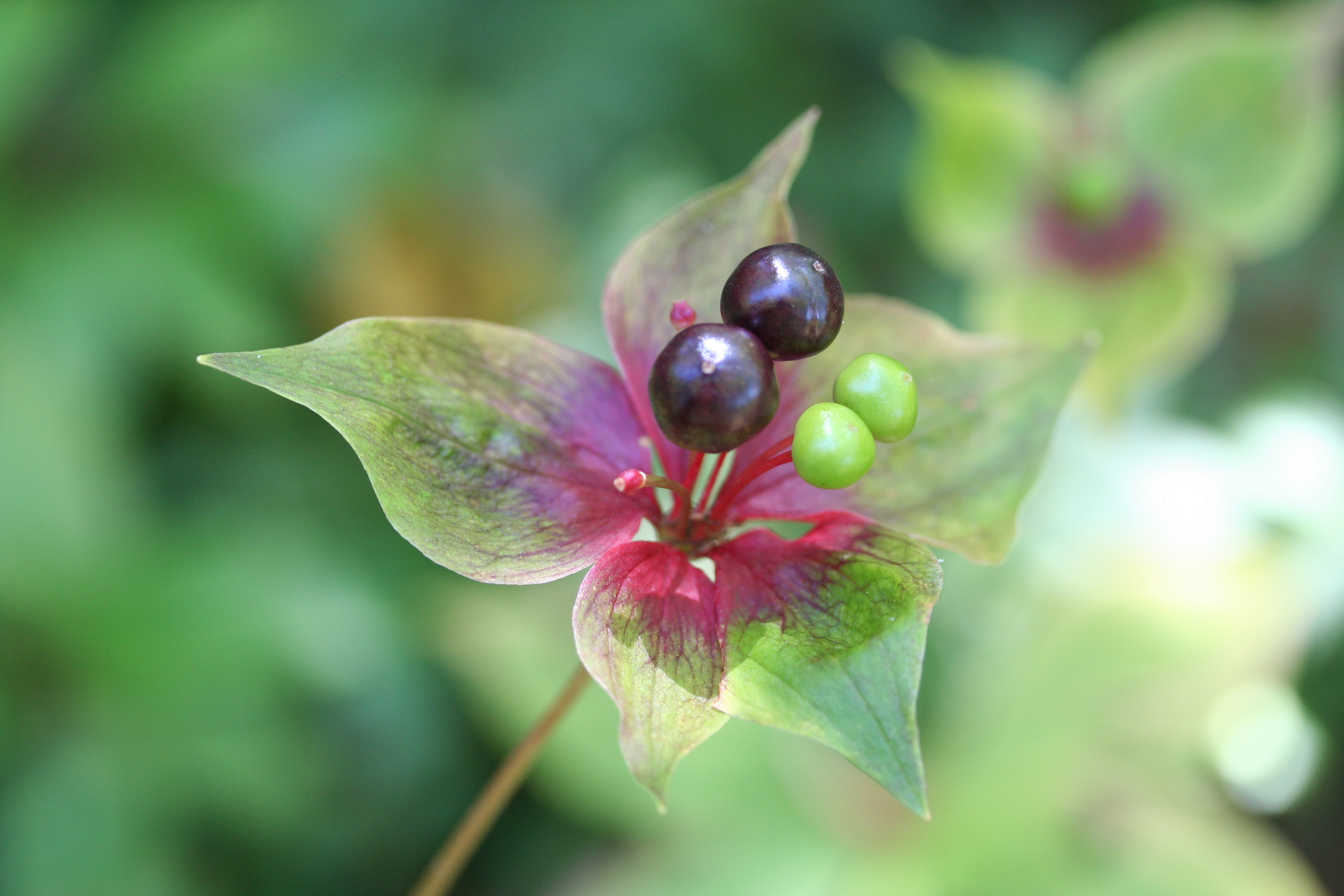
Medeola virginiana, Quebec, Canada

Medeola virginiana is found from Ontario to Nova Scotia, south to Florida, and Louisiana. It grows in rich, moist forests, thickets, and woodlands.

It is listed as an endangered plant in Florida and in Illinois.

== Uses ==
This plant produces a crisp, edible tuber that smells and tastes like garden cucumber; it can be washed and eaten raw or cooked. Iroquois used the plant as an anticonvulsant and pediatric aid.
