= Corn lily =

Corn lily is a common name for several plants and may refer to:

- Calystegia sepium, more commonly hedge bindweed, widespread in the northern hemisphere
- Clintonia borealis, more commonly blue bead-lily, a wildflower from North America
- Convolvulus arvensis, more commonly field bindweed, native to Eurasia
- Ixia spp.
- Sparaxis spp., a genus from South Africa
- Veratrum spp.
