= Naked lady =

Naked lady or naked ladies may refer to several plants:

- Amaryllis, the only genus in the subtribe Amaryllidinae
- Colchicum autumnale, an autumn-blooming flowering plant
- Euphorbia tirucalli, a tree that grows in semi-arid tropical climate
- Lycoris squamigera, a plant in the amaryllis family

== See also ==
- Naked Lady (disambiguation)
