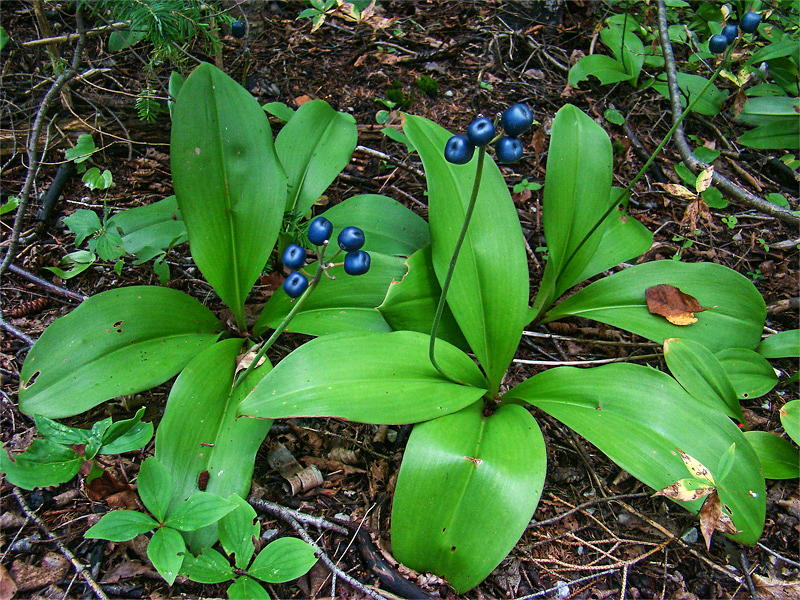
- Fruits of Clintonia borealis

Scientific classification
- Kingdom: Plantae
- Clade: Tracheophytes
- Clade: Angiosperms
- Clade: Monocots
- Order: Liliales
- Family: Liliaceae
- Subfamily: Lilioideae
- Tribe: Medeoleae
- Genus: Clintonia; Raf.

Synonyms
- Hylocharis Regel & Tiling; Xeniatrum Salisb.

= Clintonia =

Genus of flowering plants

Clintonia is a genus of flowering plants in the lily family Liliaceae. Plants of the genus are distributed across the temperate regions of North America and eastern Asia, in the mesic understory of deciduous or coniferous forests. The genus, first described by Constantine Samuel Rafinesque in 1818, was named for DeWitt Clinton (1769–1828), a naturalist and politician from the U.S. state of New York. For this reason, plants of the genus are commonly known as Clinton's lily. The common name bluebead (and by extension bluebead lily) refer to the distinctive fruit of members of the genus. Since fruit color varies somewhat across species, the common name bead lily is used as well.

== Description ==
The genus Clintonia is morphologically diverse. Species are herbaceous perennial plants growing from rhizomatous underground stems with thin, fibrous roots. They grow from 1.5 to 8 dm tall. They have 2 to 6 basal leaves arising from the rhizome crown, the basal leaves are sessile and sheathing, and the cauline leaves have a stalk. The blade of each leaf has a prominent central vein and entire margins, and the bottom ends are obovate to oblanceolate in shape. The leaf apex is acute to abruptly short-acuminate, often mucronate (ending abruptly in a short sharp point). The inflorescences are terminal, and the flowers are arranged into short racemes or umbel-like clusters, with 1 to 45 flowers. The flowers have 6 tepals with nectaries present. The stamens are inserted at the base of the perianth, and the anthers are oblong-obovate to oblong-linear shaped. The rounded to cylinder shaped ovary is superior with two chambers (sometime three). Each chamber produces 2 to 10 ovules. The smooth fruits are berry-like, round to egg-shaped, metallic blue to black in color. Four to thirty seeds are produced in each fruit and the seeds are shiny brown, round and the ends are angled with 2 or 3 faces.

Identification Key
1	Inflorescence single-flowered	(5)
+	Inflorescence 3–45-flowered	(2)
2 (1)	Inflorescence 3–12-flowered, in one or more short, terminal racemes	(3)
+	Inflorescence 10–45-flowered, in one or more umbel-like clusters	(4)
3 (2)	Inflorescence 3–8(–10)-flowered, in short, terminal racemes; tepals yellow to yellowish green, 12–16 mm long; filaments 12–17.5 mm long; anthers 2–3.5 mm long; berries ultramarine blue, 8–16-seeded; eastern North America	Clintonia borealis
+	Inflorescence 3–12-flowered, in short, terminal racemes; tepals white, sometimes bluish, 7–12 mm long; stamens 4–6(–8) mm long; berries blackish blue, many-seeded; eastern Asia	Clintonia udensis
4 (2)	Inflorescence 20–45-flowered, in a terminal umbel-like cluster, usually with one or more lateral clusters; tepals claret red, 10–18 mm long; filaments 7–10 mm long; anthers 1.8–2.8 mm long; berries blue to bluish black, 10–30-seeded; California, Oregon	Clintonia andrewsiana
+	Inflorescence 10–25(–30)-flowered, in terminal umbel-like cluster (no lateral clusters); tepals white, often spotted purplish brown or green distally, 5.5–8 mm long; filaments 5.5–7 mm long; anthers 3.5–5.5 mm long; berries black, 2–4-seeded; eastern United States	Clintonia umbellulata
5 (1)	Inflorescence single-flowered (occasionally 2–flowered); tepals creamy white, 18–25 mm long; filaments 11–18 mm long; anthers 3.5–5.5 mm long; berries deep lustrous blue, 10–18-seeded; western North America	Clintonia uniflora

== Taxonomy ==
As of August 2020, Plants of the World Online (POWO) accepts the following species in the genus Clintonia Raf.:

Image	Scientific name	Distribution
	Clintonia andrewsiana Torr.	West Coast of the United States in California and Oregon
	Clintonia borealis (Aiton) Raf.	eastern North America
	Clintonia udensis Trautv. & C.A.Mey.	Russian Far East to southeast Asia
	Clintonia umbellulata (Michx.) Morong	Appalachian Mountains in the eastern United States
	Clintonia uniflora (Menzies ex Schult. & Schult.f.) Kunth	western North America

POWO also accepts the infraspecies Clintonia udensis var. alpina (Kunth ex Baker) H.Hara but some authorities do not accept this name.

Molecular phylogenetic studies demonstrate two major disjunct clades, in eastern Asia and in North America respectively, and with the latter in East and in West. Within the family Liliaceae, Clintonia is a sister group to Medeola.

== Distribution ==
There are five species of Clintonia, four in North America and one in Asia.

=== North America ===
Two species of Clintonia occur in western North America:

- C. andrewsiana is localized along the West Coast of the United States, from central California to southwestern Oregon.
- C. uniflora ranges from central California to southern Alaska, extending east into Alberta and Montana.

The remaining two species are found in eastern North America:

- C. borealis is wide-ranging, from Newfoundland and Labrador to Manitoba, extending south across New England and the Great Lakes region into the Appalachian Mountains.
- C. umbellulata is endemic to the Appalachian Mountains in the eastern United States.

==== Canada ====
- Alberta: C. uniflora
- British Columbia: C. uniflora
- Manitoba: C. borealis
- New Brunswick: C. borealis
- Newfoundland and Labrador: C. borealis
- Nova Scotia: C. borealis
- Ontario: C. borealis
- Prince Edward Island: C. borealis
- Quebec: C. borealis
- Saskatchewan: none

The species C. borealis is also known to occur on the islands of Saint Pierre and Miquelon, a French territory near the Canadian province of Newfoundland and Labrador.

==== United States ====
- Alabama: none
- Alaska: C. uniflora
- Arizona: none
- Arkansas: none
- California: C. andrewsiana, C. uniflora
- Colorado: none
- Connecticut: C. borealis
- Delaware: none
- District of Columbia: none
- Florida: none
- Georgia: C. borealis, C. umbellulata
- Hawaii: none
- Idaho: C. uniflora
- Illinois: C. borealis
- Indiana: C. borealis
- Iowa: none
- Kansas: none
- Kentucky: C. umbellulata
- Louisiana: none
- Maine: C. borealis
- Maryland: C. borealis, C. umbellulata
- Massachusetts: C. borealis
- Michigan: C. borealis
- Minnesota: C. borealis
- Mississippi: none
- Missouri: none
- Montana: C. uniflora
- Nebraska: none
- Nevada: none
- New Hampshire: C. borealis
- New Jersey: C. borealis
- New Mexico: none
- New York: C. borealis, C. umbellulata
- North Carolina: C. borealis, C. umbellulata
- North Dakota: none
- Ohio: C. borealis, C. umbellulata
- Oklahoma: none
- Oregon: C. andrewsiana, C. uniflora
- Pennsylvania: C. borealis, C. umbellulata
- Rhode Island: C. borealis
- South Carolina: C. umbellulata
- South Dakota: none
- Tennessee: C. borealis, C. umbellulata
- Texas: none
- Utah: none
- Vermont: C. borealis
- Virginia: C. borealis, C. umbellulata
- Washington: C. uniflora
- West Virginia: C. borealis, C. umbellulata
- Wisconsin: C. borealis
- Wyoming: none

=== Asia ===
The species C. udensis is found in eastern Asia, from the Russian Far East to southeast Asia, extending from the Kuril Islands in the Pacific Ocean to the Western Himalaya region.

== Ecology ==
Spring blooming.

== Cultivation ==
Clintonia species are cultivated as garden subjects in shade gardens, grown for the glossy foliage, small lily-like flowers, and blue fruits, and their ability to live in heavy shade. They grow best in cool, organic-rich, acid soils that retain moisture and when grown well form dense slowly spreading clumps.

== See also ==
- Bead lily
- List of plants known as bluebead
- List of plants known as lily

== Bibliography ==
- Hayashi, Kazuhiko; Yoshida, Seiji; Utech, Frederick H.; Kawano, Shoichi (August 2001). "Molecular systematics in the genus Clintonia and related taxa based on rbcL and matK gene sequence data". Plant Species Biology. 16 (2): 119–137. doi:10.1046/j.1442-1984.2001.00057.x.
