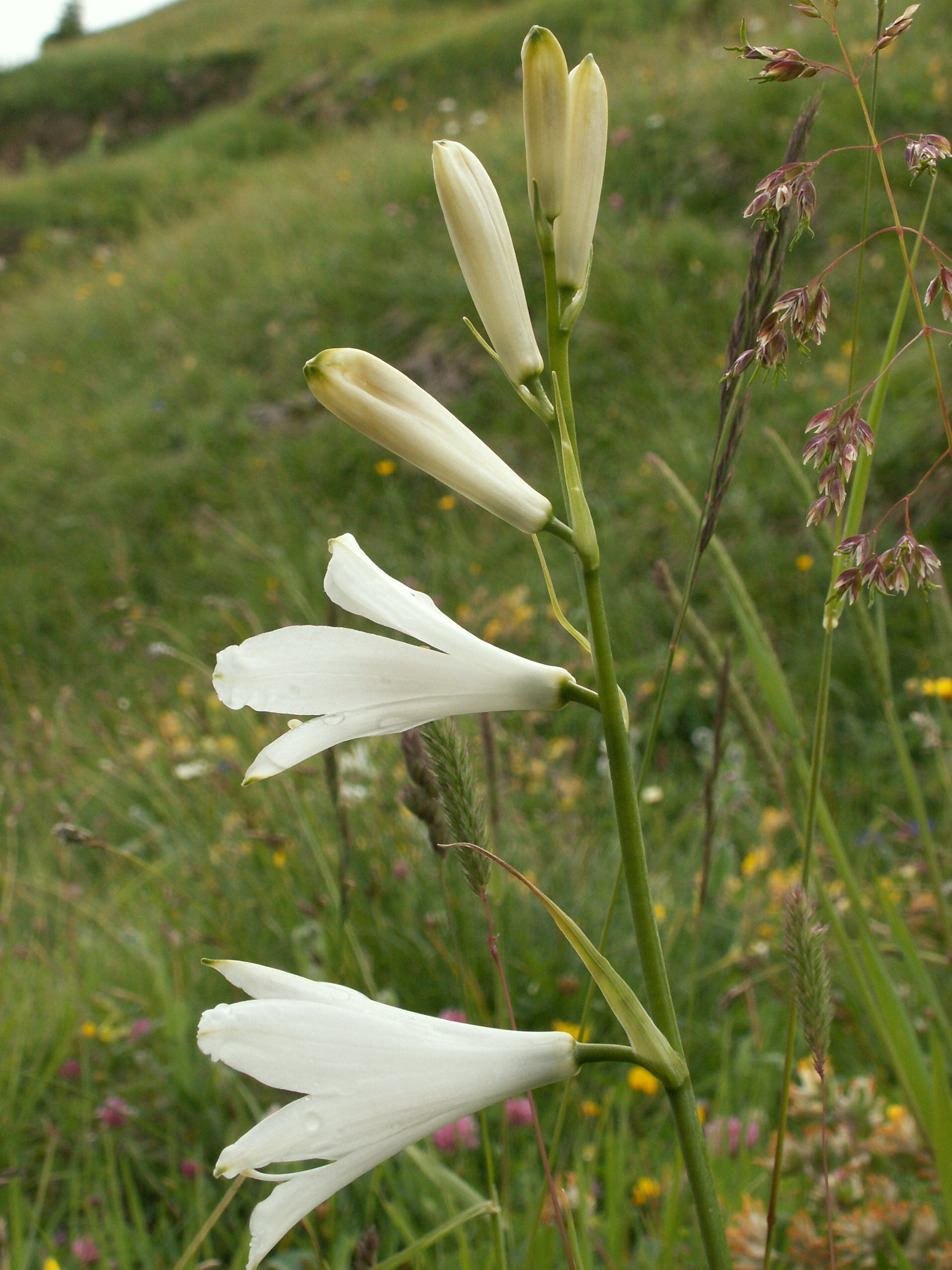
- Paradisea liliastrum

Scientific classification
- Kingdom: Plantae
- Clade: Embryophytes
- Clade: Tracheophytes
- Clade: Spermatophytes
- Clade: Angiosperms
- Clade: Monocots
- Order: Asparagales
- Family: Asparagaceae
- Subfamily: Agavoideae
- Tribe: Anthericeae
- Genus: Paradisea; Mazzuc., nom. cons.

Synonyms
- Allobrogia Tratt.; Czackia Andrz.; Hyperogyne Salisb.; Liliastrum Fabr.; Liliastrum Link; Pleisolirion Raf.

= Paradisea =

Genus of flowering plants

Paradisea (paradise lily) is a European genus of flowering plants in the family Asparagaceae. It was formerly classified in the family Anthericaceae or earlier in the Liliaceae. Paradisea is sometimes confused with Anthericum.

== Species ==
Paradisea contains two species of herbaceous perennials:

| Image | Scientific name | Description | Distribution |
|---|---|---|---|
| | Paradisea liliastrum (L.) Bertol. (St. Bruno's lily) | A graceful alpine meadow plant with grasslike leaves. Pure white, trumpet-shaped flowers, 3–6 cm (1–2 in) long, with prominent yellow anthers, are borne in late spring. It can be propagated by division of the roots in autumn, or from seed. In good soil it grows to 90 cm (35 in) high, and is used as an ornamental in herbaceous borders. This plant has gained the Royal Horticultural Society's Award of Garden Merit. | Mountains of southern Europe, |
| | Paradisea lusitanica (Cout.) Samp. | taller than P. liliastrum, growing to 80–120 cm (31–47 in) tall by 30–40 cm (12–16 in) wide; but with shorter flowers 2 cm long. | Portugal and Spain |

== See also ==
- List of plants known as lily
