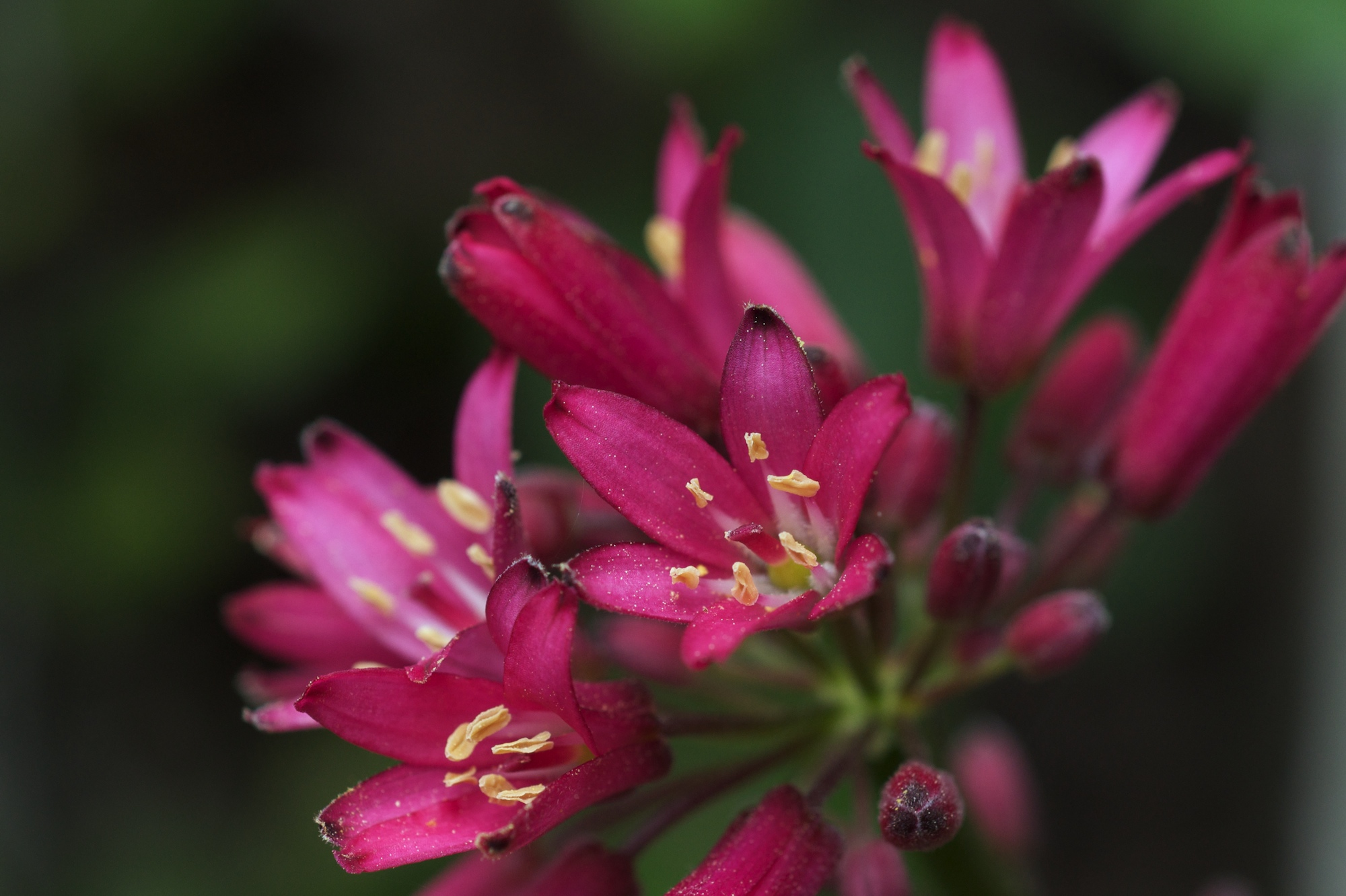
- Sonoma County, California (May 2010)

Conservation status
- Apparently Secure (NatureServe)

Scientific classification
- Kingdom: Plantae
- Clade: Tracheophytes
- Clade: Angiosperms
- Clade: Monocots
- Order: Liliales
- Family: Liliaceae
- Subfamily: Lilioideae
- Genus: Clintonia
- Species: C. andrewsiana

Binomial name
- Clintonia andrewsiana Torr.

Synonyms
- Clintonia andrewsii Alph.Wood

= Clintonia andrewsiana =

Species of flowering plant

Clintonia andrewsiana is a species of flowering plant in the lily family Liliaceae. The species was discovered by John Milton Bigelow in 1854 and described by John Torrey in 1856. The specific epithet andrewsiana honors Timothy Langdon Andrews (1819–1908), a "gentleman who assiduously examined the botany" of California during the mid-19th century. The species is commonly known as Andrews clintonia or red clintonia, where the latter refers to the color of the flowers. In California, it is also known as bluebead lily or western bluebead lily, not to be confused with C. borealis, which is likewise known as bluebead lily. The Pomo people of northern California consider the plant to be poisonous.

== Description ==
Clintonia andrewsiana is a perennial herbaceous plant that spreads by means of underground rhizomes. It is the largest plant species in the genus, standing 30 to 80 cm (12 to 31 in) tall. Around the base of the plant are 5 or 6 oval-shaped, dark green leaves, each 20 to 35 cm (8 to 14 in) long and 5 to 15 cm (2 to 6 in) wide. The tall, erect inflorescence consists of a terminal umbel with 10–20 flowers and up to three lateral umbels with 2–4 flowers each. Each flower has six pink to reddish-purple tepals 1 to 2 cm (0.4 to 0.8 in) long and six stamens about half as long as the tepals. The fruit is a blue or blue-black berry approximately 1 cm (0.4 in) in diameter.

== Distribution and habitat ==
Clintonia andrewsiana is found along the West Coast of the United States, from Monterey County in central California north to Curry County in southwestern Oregon. It prefers the shady, moist areas of the coastal redwood forests.

The range of C. andrewsiana overlaps with that of C. uniflora in Humboldt County and Del Norte County in northwestern California and Curry County in Oregon, but the two species are readily distinguished by their flowers. C. andrewsiana has multiple flowers arranged in one or more umbels while C. uniflora has a single flower with white tepals. The tepals of C. andrewsiana are a deep claret red.

== Gallery ==
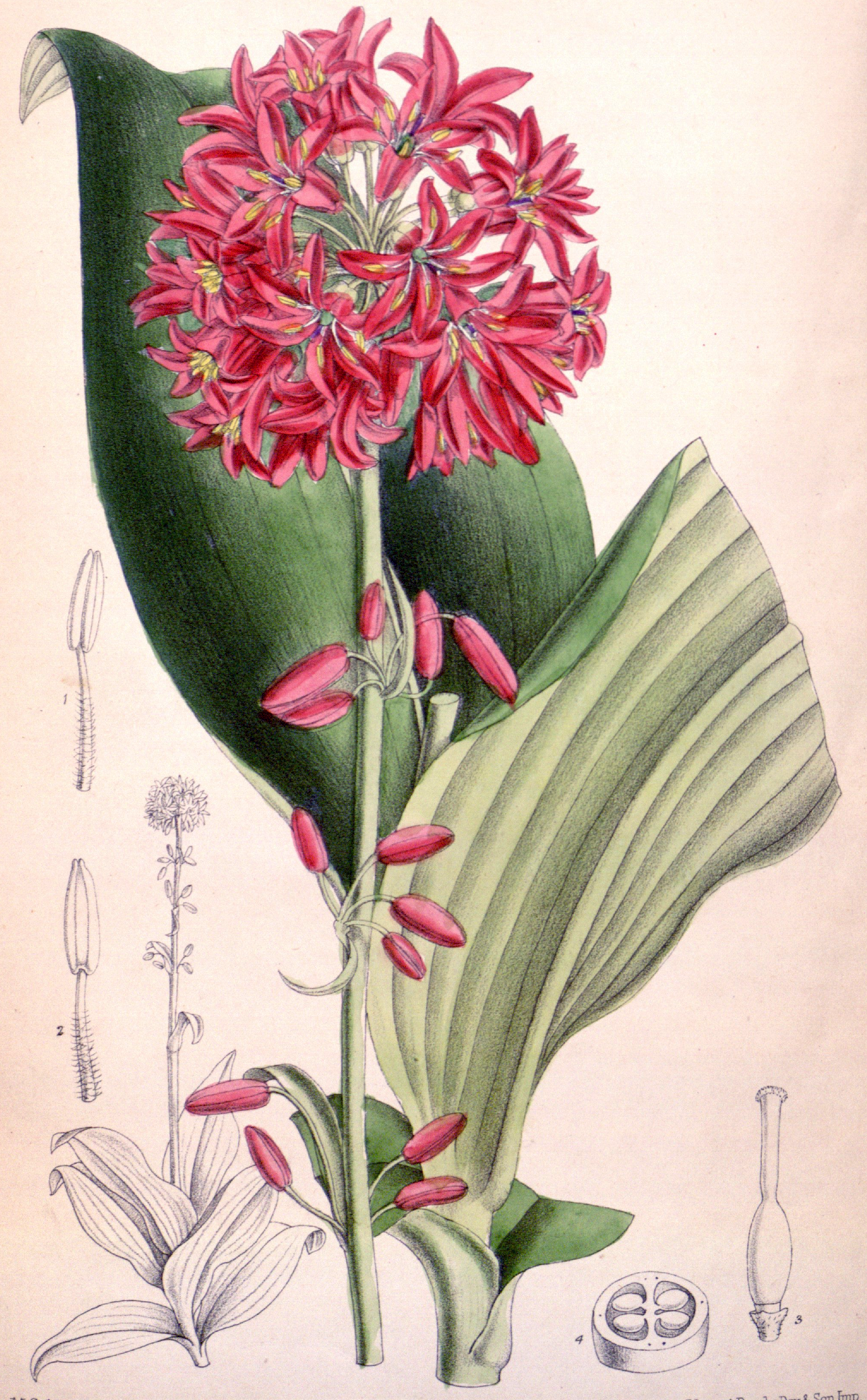
Illustration by John Nugent Fitch

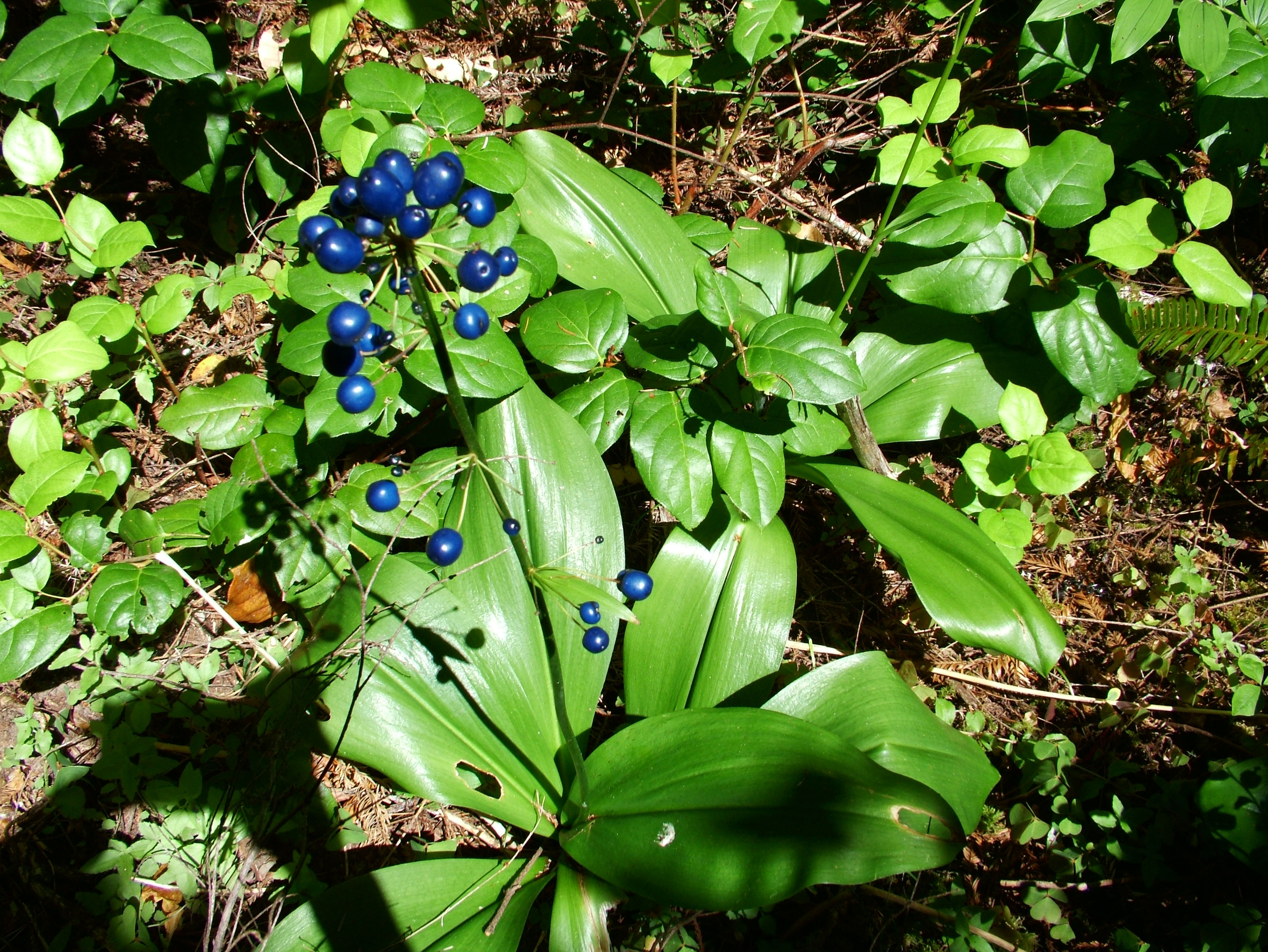
Ripe fruit

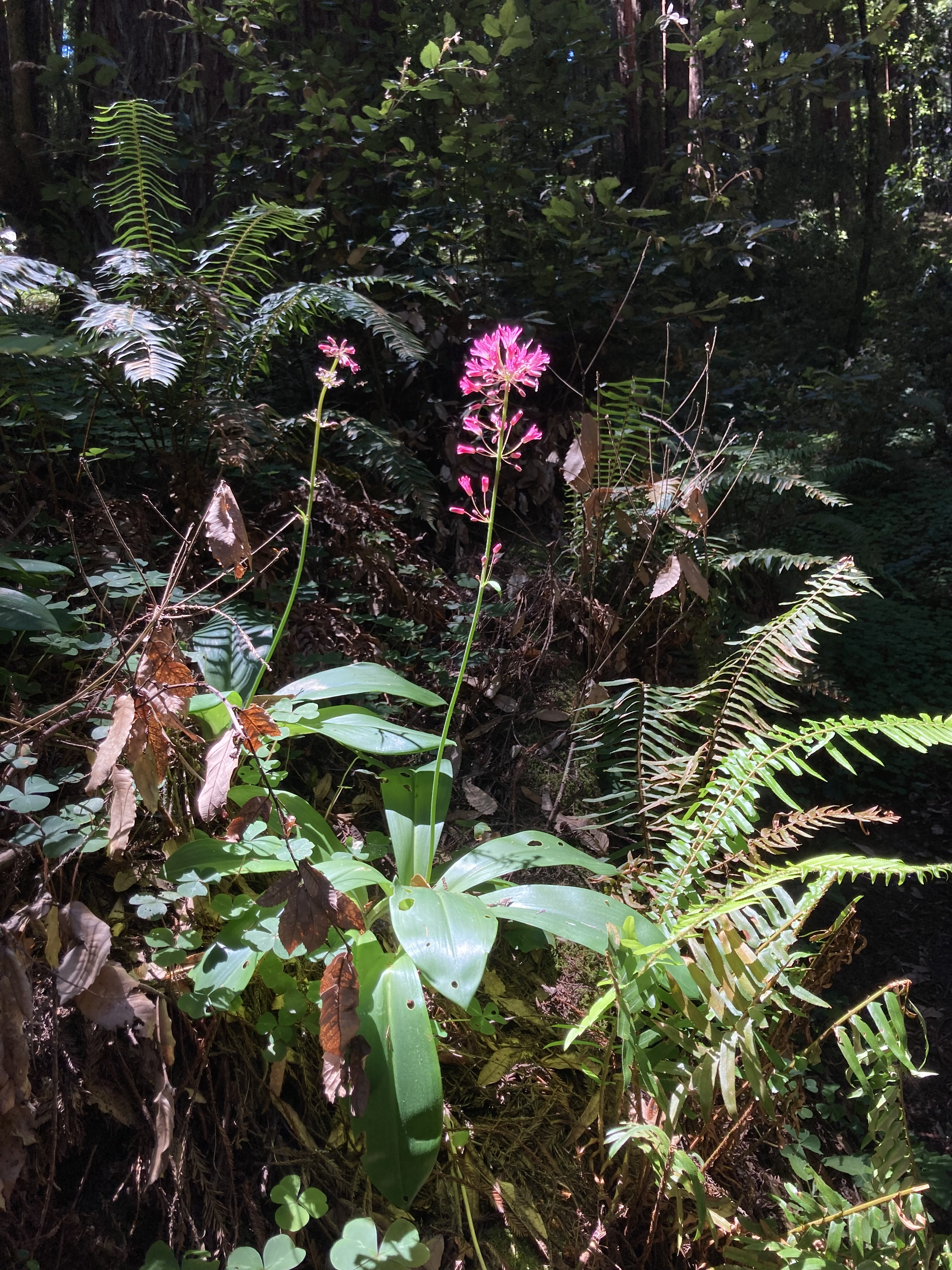
Clintonia andrewsiana at Nisene Marks Park

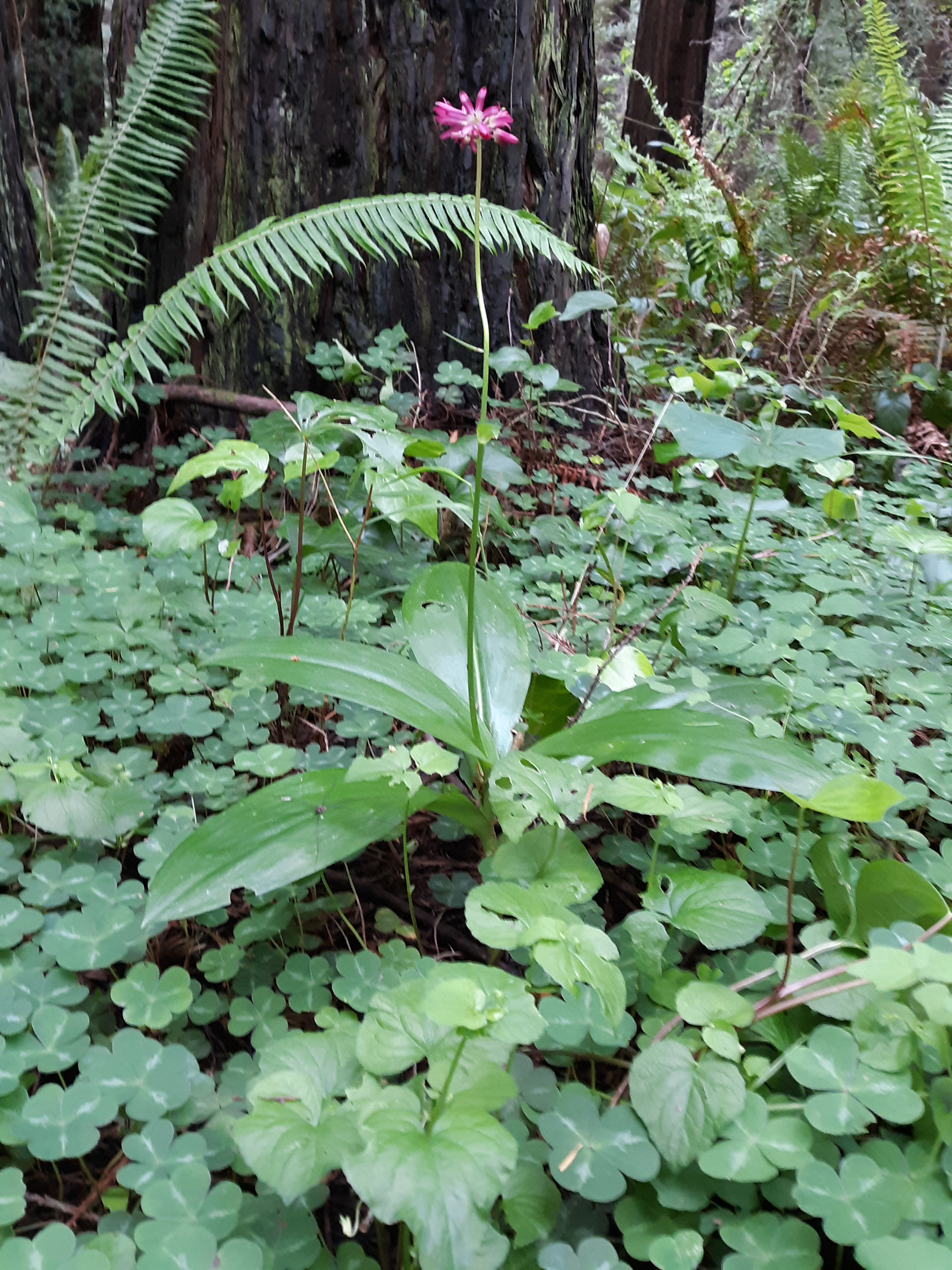
The flowers in Humboldt County

== See also ==
- Bead lily
- List of plants known as bluebead
- List of plants known as lily
