= Bluebeat =

Bluebeat may refer to:

- Ska music
- Blue Beat Records
- BlueBeat Music

== See also ==
- List of plants known as bluebead
- Bluebeard (disambiguation)
