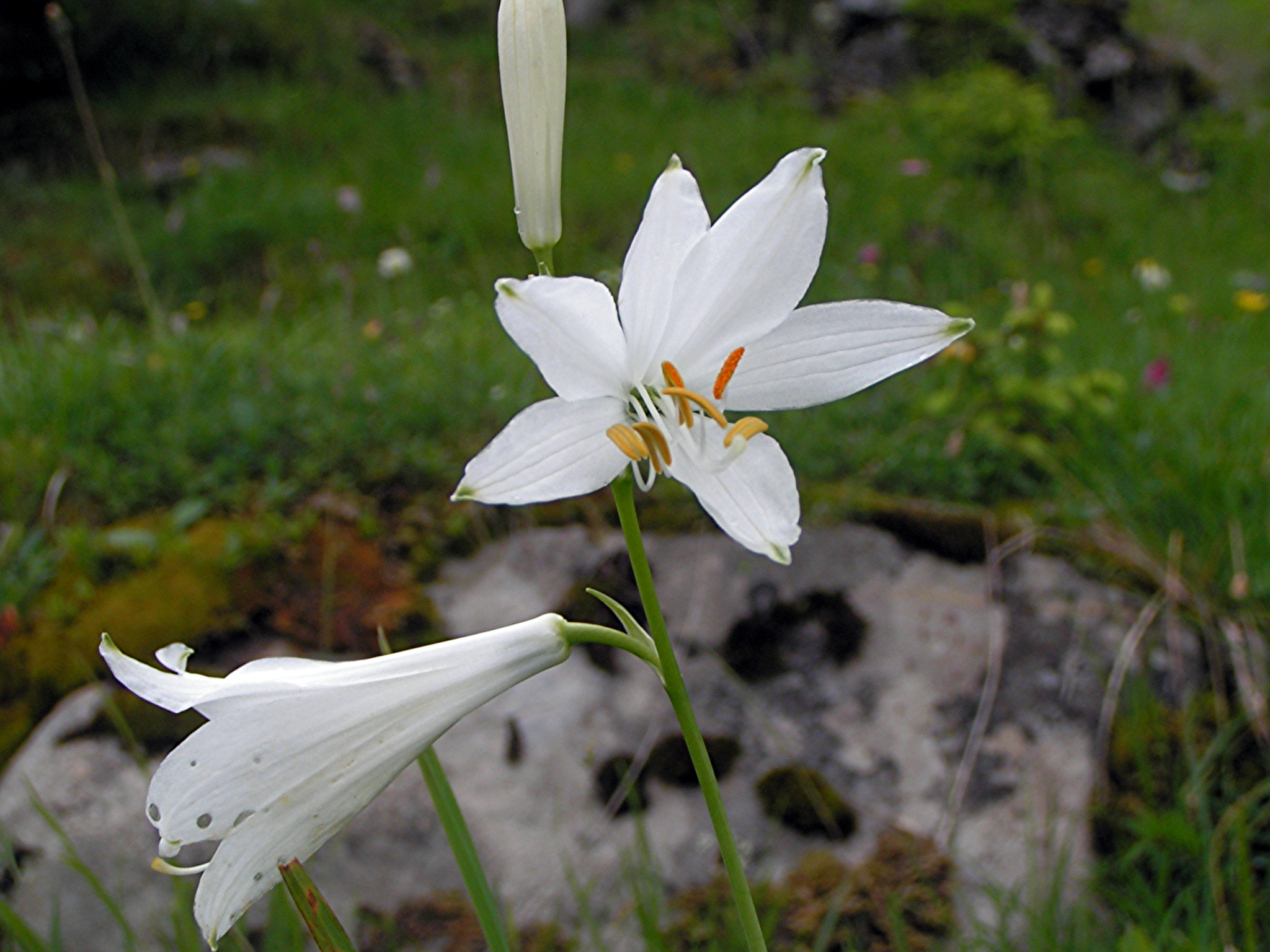

Scientific classification
- Kingdom: Plantae
- Clade: Tracheophytes
- Clade: Angiosperms
- Clade: Monocots
- Order: Asparagales
- Family: Asparagaceae
- Subfamily: Agavoideae
- Genus: Paradisea
- Species: P. liliastrum

Binomial name
- Paradisea liliastrum (L.) Bertol.

= Paradisea liliastrum =

Species of flowering plant

Paradisea liliastrum (or St Bruno's lily) is a species of flowering plant in the family Asparagaceae. It is native to the Alps, the Pyrenees and the Apennines.

== History ==
This species was mentioned by the Greek physician Dioscorides in his book, De Materia Medica.

The common name is named after the 11th century founder of the Carthusian order.

In 1610, The English naturalist John Tradescant ordered this plant from Brussels for the Hatfield House.

== Description ==
Their trumpet-shaped, white flowers are bunched in racemes of white flowers 4–6 cm in length.

They can be found at elevations between 1000 - 2300m.

== Cultivation ==
This species has gained the Royal Horticultural Society's Award of Garden Merit.

This plant is propagated by seed. They should be grown in partial or full sunlight in moist, but well-drained soil.
