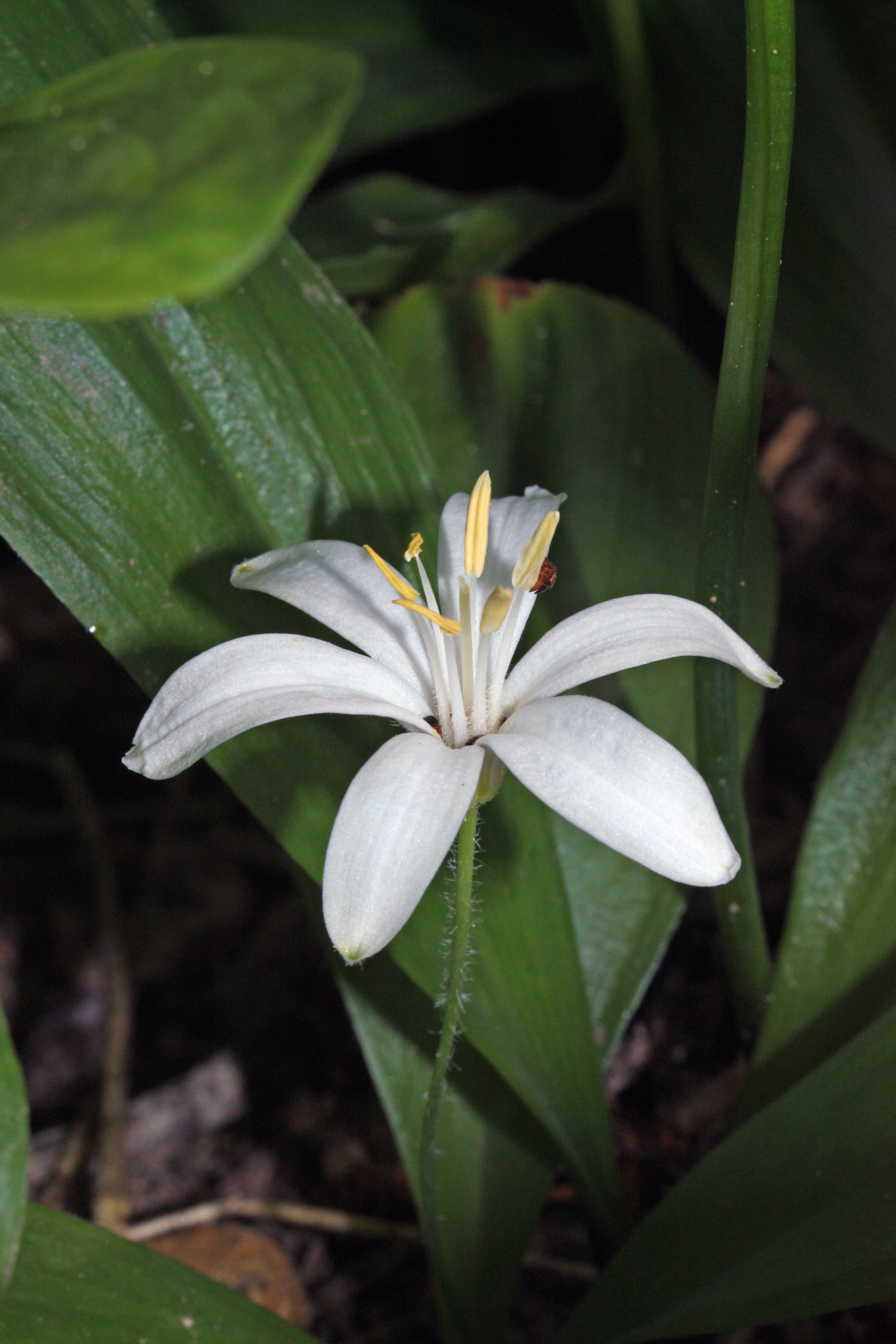
- Mount Pilchuck State Park, July 2008

Conservation status
- Secure (NatureServe)

Scientific classification
- Kingdom: Plantae
- Clade: Tracheophytes
- Clade: Angiosperms
- Clade: Monocots
- Order: Liliales
- Family: Liliaceae
- Subfamily: Lilioideae
- Genus: Clintonia
- Species: C. uniflora

Binomial name
- Clintonia uniflora (Menzies ex Schult. & Schult. f.) Kunth

Synonyms
- Smilacina uniflora (Menzies ex Schult. & Schult.f.) Hook.

= Clintonia uniflora =

Species of flowering plant

Clintonia uniflora, commonly known as bride's bonnet, queen's cup, or bead lily, is a species of flowering plant in the lily family Liliaceae. The specific epithet uniflora means "one-flowered", a characteristic that distinguishes this species from others in the genus Clintonia. For this reason, it is also known as the single-flowered clintonia.

== Description ==
Clintonia uniflora is a perennial herbaceous plant that spreads by means of underground rhizomes. It is the smallest plant in the genus, only 15 to 25 cm (6 to 10 in) tall. It has two or three leaves located at the base of a hairy stem. Each leaf is 2.5 to 6.5 cm (1 to 3 in) wide and 8 to 20 cm (3 to 8 in) long. A plant typically bears a single flower but occasionally there will be an inflorescence of two flowers. The small flower has six white tepals, each approximately 2 cm (0.8 in) long, and six protruding white stamens with pollen-dusted anthers. After pollination, the flower is replaced by a round blue berry approximately 1 cm (0.4 in) in diameter.

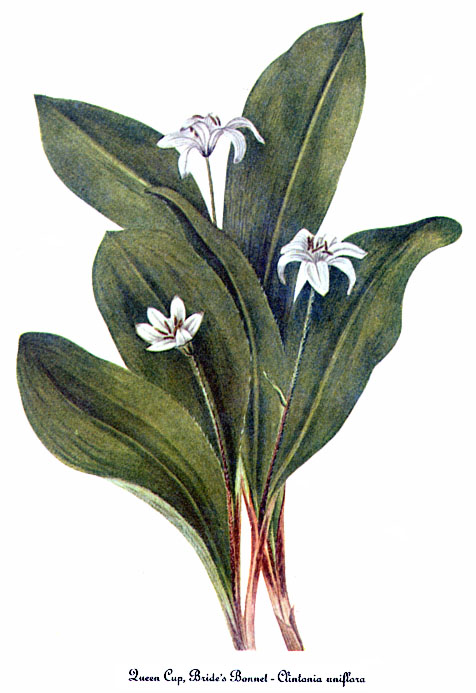
Watercolor painting by Mary Vaux Walcott

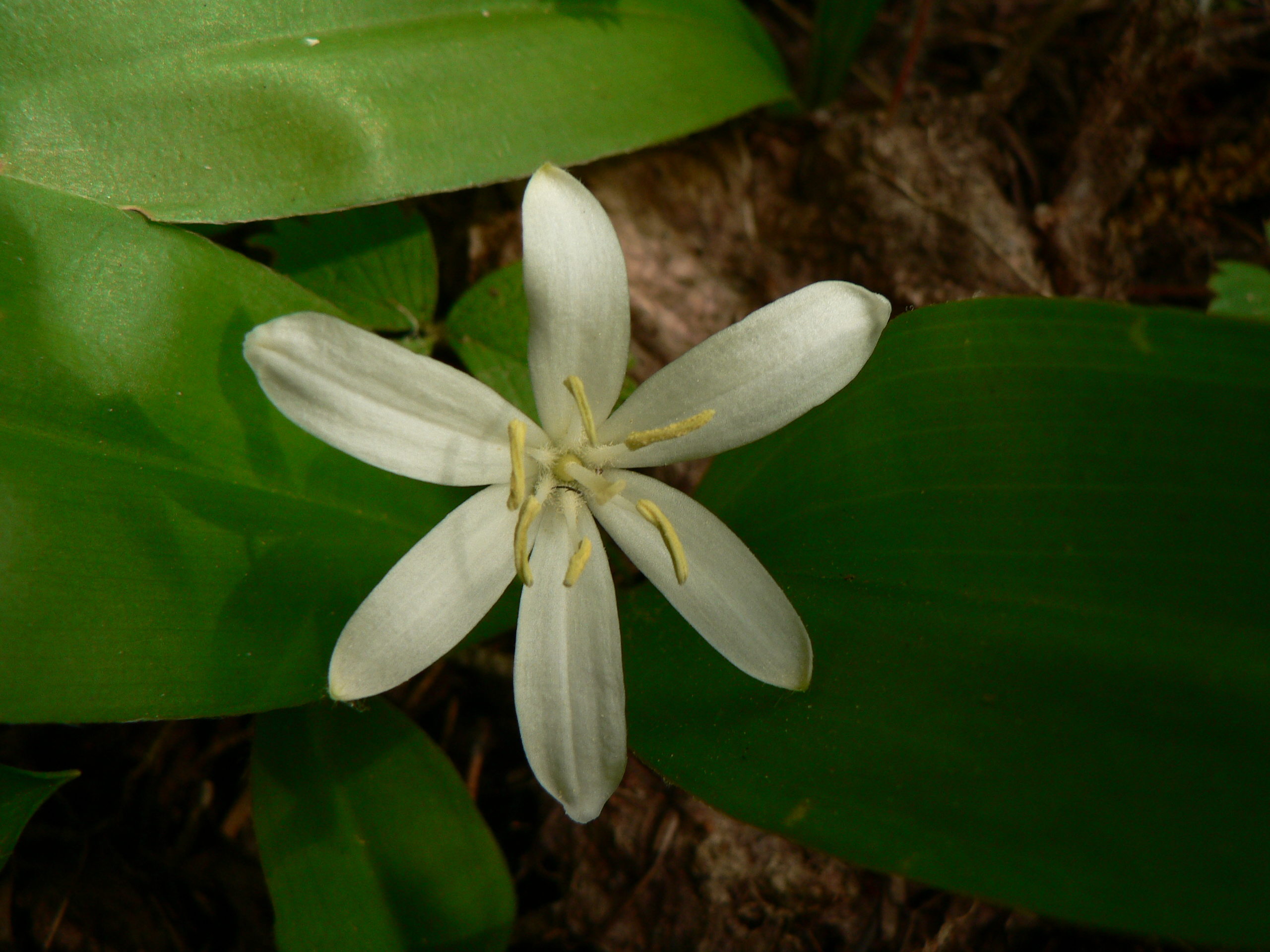
The solitary flower has six tepals and six stamens.

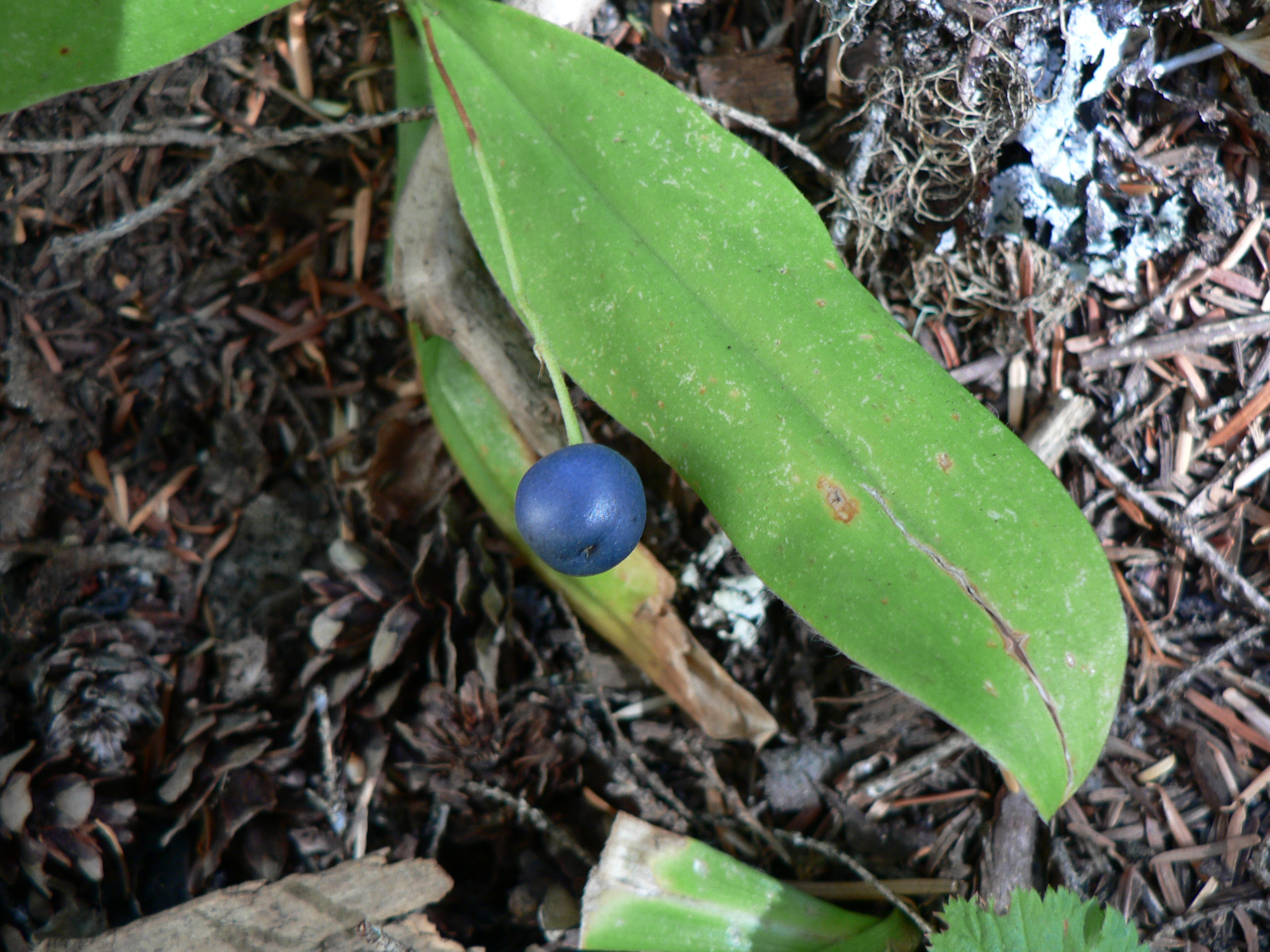
The fruit is a single round blue berry up to a centimeter in diameter.

== Taxonomy ==
In 1829, Josef August Schultes described the plant variety Smilacina borealis var. uniflora, which was later segregated into species Smilacina uniflora. The latter was to become a synonym for Clintonia uniflora, first described by Carl Sigismund Kunth in 1850.

== Distribution ==
Clintonia uniflora is native to western North America, from southern Alaska to central California, extending eastward into southwestern Alberta and northwestern Montana. It prefers cool montane coniferous forests, typically at elevations from 3,000 to 5,000 ft (914 to 1,524 m).

C. uniflora occurs in many forest types but it prefers a cool moist coniferous forest consisting of western red cedar (Thuja plicata), western hemlock (Tsuga heterophylla), grand fir (Abies grandis), subalpine fir (Abies lasiocarpa), and Pacific silver fir (Abies amabilis). It is also associated with western white pine (Pinus monticola), Alaska cedar (Chamaecyparis nootkatensis), and noble fir (Abies procera). Companion species in the understory include threeleaf foamflower (Tiarella trifoliata), twinflower (Linnaea borealis), and Canadian bunchberry (Cornus canadensis).

The range of C. uniflora overlaps with that of C. andrewsiana in Humboldt County and Del Norte County in northwestern California and Curry County in southwestern Oregon, but the two species are readily distinguished by their overall size and their flowers. C. uniflora has a single flower with white tepals while C. andrewsiana has multiple flowers arranged in one or more umbels. The tepals of the latter are a deep claret red.

== Ecology ==
Clintonia uniflora is a perennial geophyte that can live up to 30 years (or more). The plant flowers between late May and July, and thereafter the fruit matures from late July to September. Citizen scientists observe flowering plants uniformly throughout June and July.

The plant is not considered palatable but it is of at least minor importance as food for some wildlife species including birds, elk, and deer. Frugivorous birds are the only reported dispersers of the seeds, which remain viable in the ground for at least a couple of years.

== Uses ==
The indigenous peoples of the Pacific Northwest, including the Nuxalk, the Cowlitz, and the Haisla peoples, used the plant as a dermatological aid and eye medicine. The Nlaka'pamux (also known as the Thompson people) mashed the ripe blue fruit and used it as a dye or stain. Today Clintonia uniflora is used as a garden ornamental.

== See also ==
- Bead lily
- List of plants known as bluebead
- List of plants known as lily
- Queen's cup

== Bibliography ==
- Moss, E. H. 1983. Flora of Alberta (ed. 2) i–xii, 1–687. University of Toronto Press, Toronto.
- Hultén, E. 1968. Flora of Alaska i–xxi, 1–1008. Stanford University Press, Stanford.
- Hitchcock, C. H., A.J. Cronquist, F. M. Ownbey & J. W. Thompson. 1969. Vascular Cryptogams, Gymnosperms, and Monocotyledons. 1: 1–914. In C. L. Hitchcock Vascular Plants of the Pacific Northwest. University of Washington Press, Seattle.
