= The Bags (Massachusetts band) =

American hard rock band

- Origin: Lexington, Massachusetts
- Genres: Hard rock, punk rock, heavy metal
- Years active: 1985–present
- Members: Jon Hardy; Jim Janota; Crispin Wood
- Website: www.thebags.org

The Bags are an American hard/punk rock band from Lexington, Massachusetts, formed in 1985. The band is composed of members Jon Hardy, Jim Janota, and Crispin Wood. Though a couple of early recordings were released on the Crawling from Within multi-artist compilation, their debut album, entitled Rock Starve, was released in 1987. An article by Charles M. Young written in Playboy magazine best describes the band's sound: "The Bags fall somewhere among the Ramones, Hüsker Dü, and early Kiss. Their debut, Rock Starve, consists of thrilling guitar-bash riffs that pound like the sound of a herd of giant woolly mammoths going over a cliff, just enough melody rasping though shredded vocal cords and lyrics wholly unbesmirched by any panty-waist college-poetry influence."

The band began touring in 1988, releasing an album under the alias of "Swamp Oaf" and later releasing an actual self-titled LP. The Bags won the WBCN Rock 'n' Roll Rumble in 1989. Their next album, Night of the Corn People, came in 1991, though the band broke up shortly thereafter. Though having gone their separate ways for over a decade (discounting a single reunion show in 1996), they reassembled in 2003 to page their latest achievement, Sharpen Your Sticks, one track of which ("Cavemen Rejoice") eventually found its way onto the PlayStation 2 game, Guitar Hero. Later, in April 2007, The Bags released a follow-up to Sharpen Your Sticks: the 14-track opus, Mount Rockmore. This latest original album was produced by Carl Plaster (Sebadoh, Buffalo Tom, The Mighty Mighty Bosstones, etc.).

Jim Janota (aka Jackie Kickassis) is also a member of the Hard Rocque outfit The Upper Crust.

== Discography ==
=== Singles ===
- "I Know" / "Hide and Seek" (Mar. 1989, Stanton Park) 7" vinyl 45
- "L. Frank Baum" / "Max Roach" (June 1991, Stanton Park) 7" vinyl 45
- "Dr. Lb." / "Frilly Underwear" (Aug. 1991, Helter Skelter) 7" vinyl 45
- "2 Songs Live" ("Ivan the Terrible" / "Hide and Seek") (June 2004, Oaf Records) a CD single featuring live versions of the two tracks, recorded at Middle East Downstairs during a comeback tour in Feb., 2004

=== Albums ===
- Rock Starve (Nov. 1987, Restless Records)
- Swamp Oaf (June 1989, Stanton Park)
- The Bags
  - (Mar. 1990, Stanton Park) the original, untitled LP
  - (2008, Oaf Records) a CD version, entitled The Bags '89, which also features 1989 Stanton Park single ("I Know"/"Hide and Seek"), and a couple of previously unreleased tracks
- Night of the Corn People
  - (Aug. 1991, Stanton Park) a CD featuring the main album, the "Waiting for Maloney" opus, and the "Dr. Lb."/"Frilly Underwear" single
  - (Jan. 1992, Helter Skelter) a colored-vinyl Double-LP release featuring the above, but with five unreleased tracks added instead of the single's
- Sharpen Your Sticks (Feb. 2005, Oaf Records)
- Mount Rockmore (April 2007, Oaf Records)
