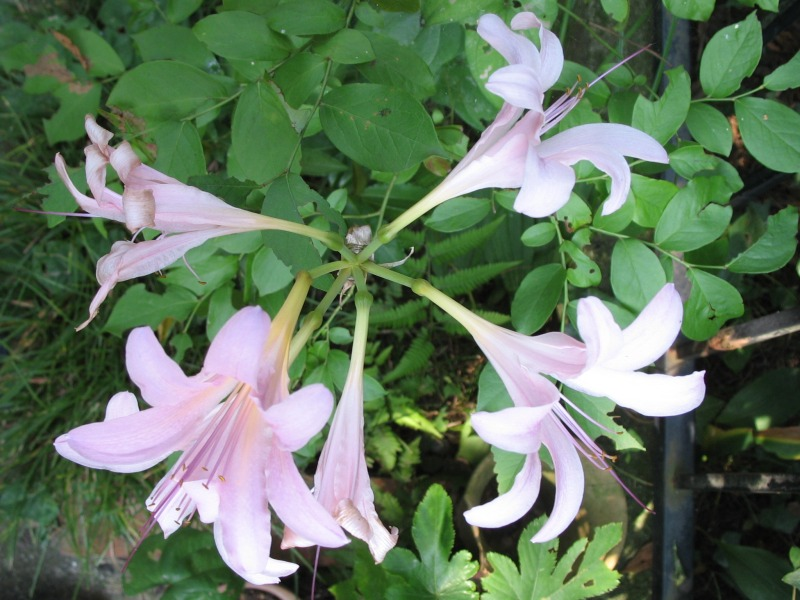
- Flowers

Scientific classification
- Kingdom: Plantae
- Clade: Tracheophytes
- Clade: Angiosperms
- Clade: Monocots
- Order: Asparagales
- Family: Amaryllidaceae
- Subfamily: Amaryllidoideae
- Genus: Lycoris
- Species: L. squamigera

Binomial name
- Lycoris squamigera Maxim.

Synonyms
- Homotypic Synonyms: Hippeastrum squamigerum (Maxim.) H.Lév.; Heterotypic Synonyms: Amaryllis hallii Baker

= Lycoris squamigera =

Species of flowering plant

Lycoris squamigera, the resurrection lily or surprise lily, is a species of flowering plant in the amaryllis family, Amaryllidaceae, subfamily Amaryllidoideae. It is also sometimes referred to as naked ladies (a name used for several other plants). It is native to southeast China and Korea.

== Description ==
Lycoris squamigera is an herbaceous plant with abundant and long (up to 12" long and 1" wide) leaves ("clothes") that appear in spring. The leaves are no longer present when the flowers emerge much later, without their "clothes", from the bare ground, hence the name "Naked Ladies". The leaves sprout from the bulbs and grow in the spring, then die back during June, leaving no signs of life. The flowers spring dramatically from the bare ground in mid to late summer, and it usually takes only four to five days from first emergence to full bloom. This suddenness is reflected in its common names: surprise lily, magic lily, and resurrection lily. The flowers are white or pink and fragrant.

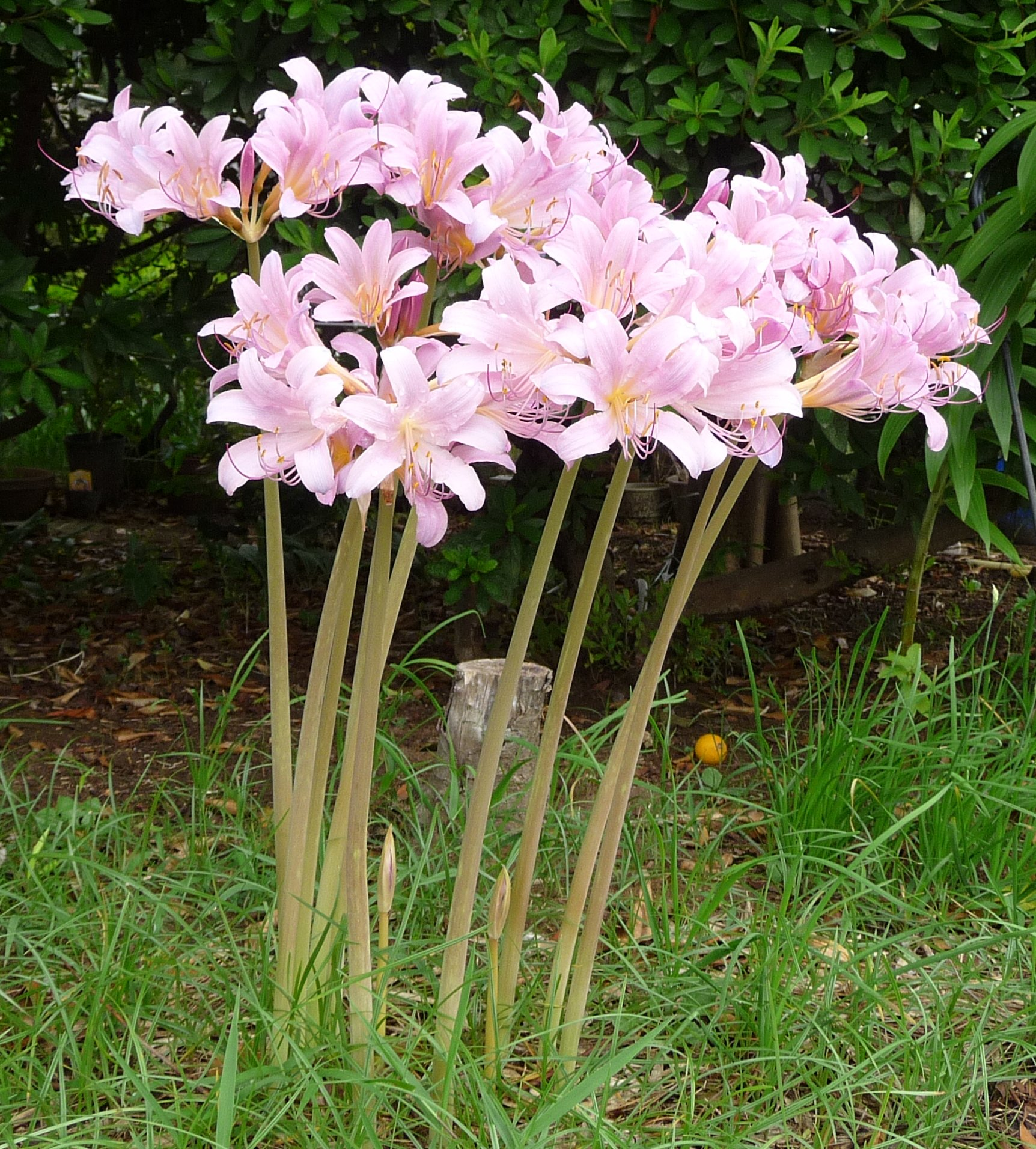
Flowers emerged, leaves are not present; two buds on short stem from ground – Chiba, Japan

== See also ==
- List of plants known as lily
