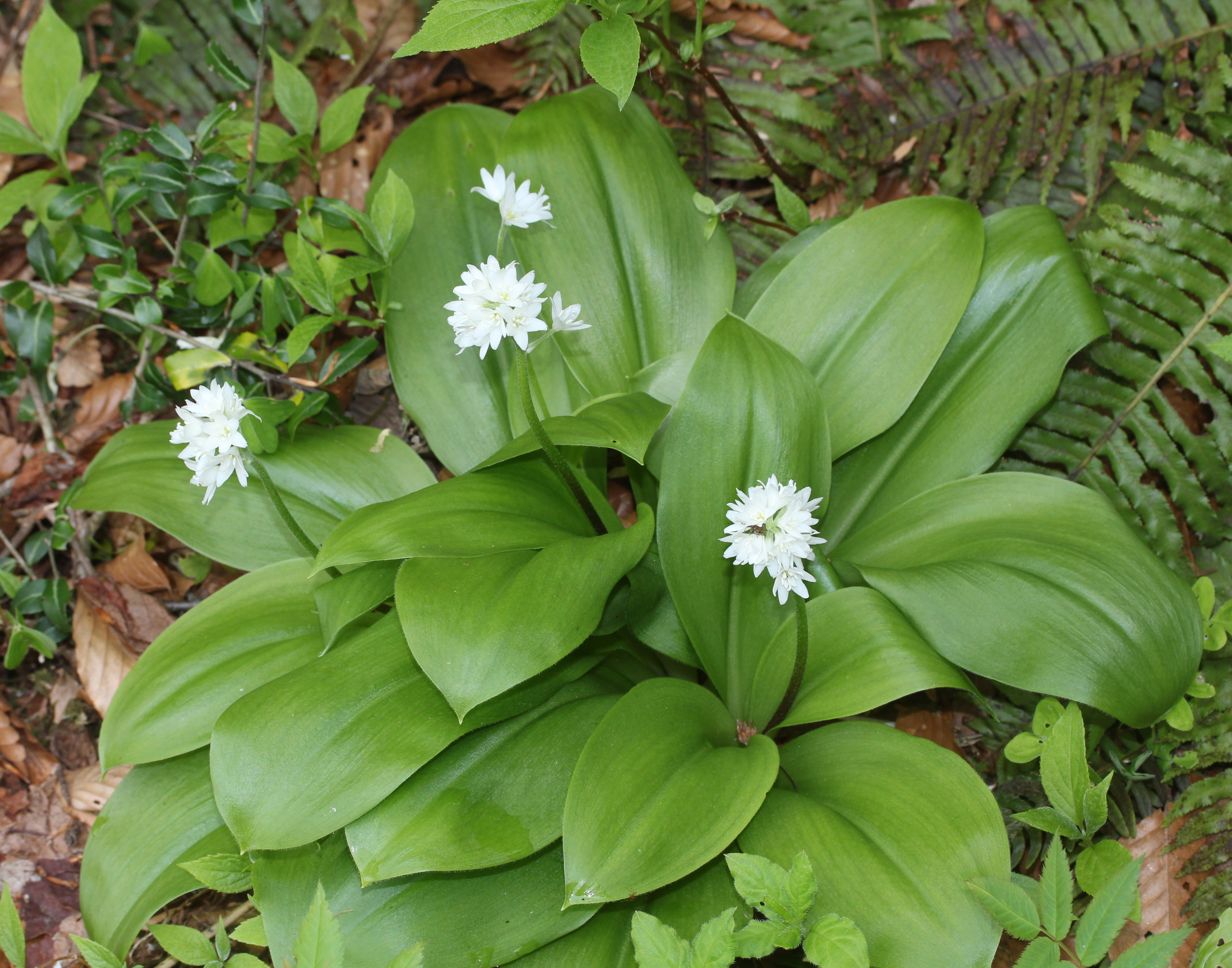

Scientific classification
- Kingdom: Plantae
- Clade: Tracheophytes
- Clade: Angiosperms
- Clade: Monocots
- Order: Liliales
- Family: Liliaceae
- Subfamily: Lilioideae
- Genus: Clintonia
- Species: C. udensis

Binomial name
- Clintonia udensis Trautv. & C.A.Mey

Synonyms
- Clintonia alpina var. udensis (Trautv. & C.A.Mey.) J.F.Macbr.; Hylocharis cyanocarpa Tiling (for C. udensis var. udensis); Smilacina alpina Royle (for C. udensis var. alpina)

= Clintonia udensis =

Species of plant

Clintonia udensis is a species of flowering plant in the lily family Liliaceae. It is the only species of Clintonia native to Asia. It prefers sparsely forested habitat including the alpine forests of the Himalayas.

== Description ==
Clintonia udensis is a perennial herbaceous plant that spreads by means of underground rhizomes, forming colonies on the floors of temperate forests. It has 3--5 egg-shaped to elliptical leaves, each leaf 8 to 25 cm (3 to 10 in) long and 3 to 16 cm (1 to 6 in) wide. The leaf margins are pubescent when young. The pubescent stem (technically, a scape) is 10 to 20 cm (4 to 8 in) long. While fruiting, the stem elongates up to 60 cm (24 in) long. The inflorescence is 3--12-flowered, in short terminal racemes with densely pubescent pedicels. The tepals are white, sometimes bluish, each tepal 7 to 12 mm (0.3 to 0.5 in) long. The berries are dark blue, almost black, up to 12 mm (0.5 in) across.

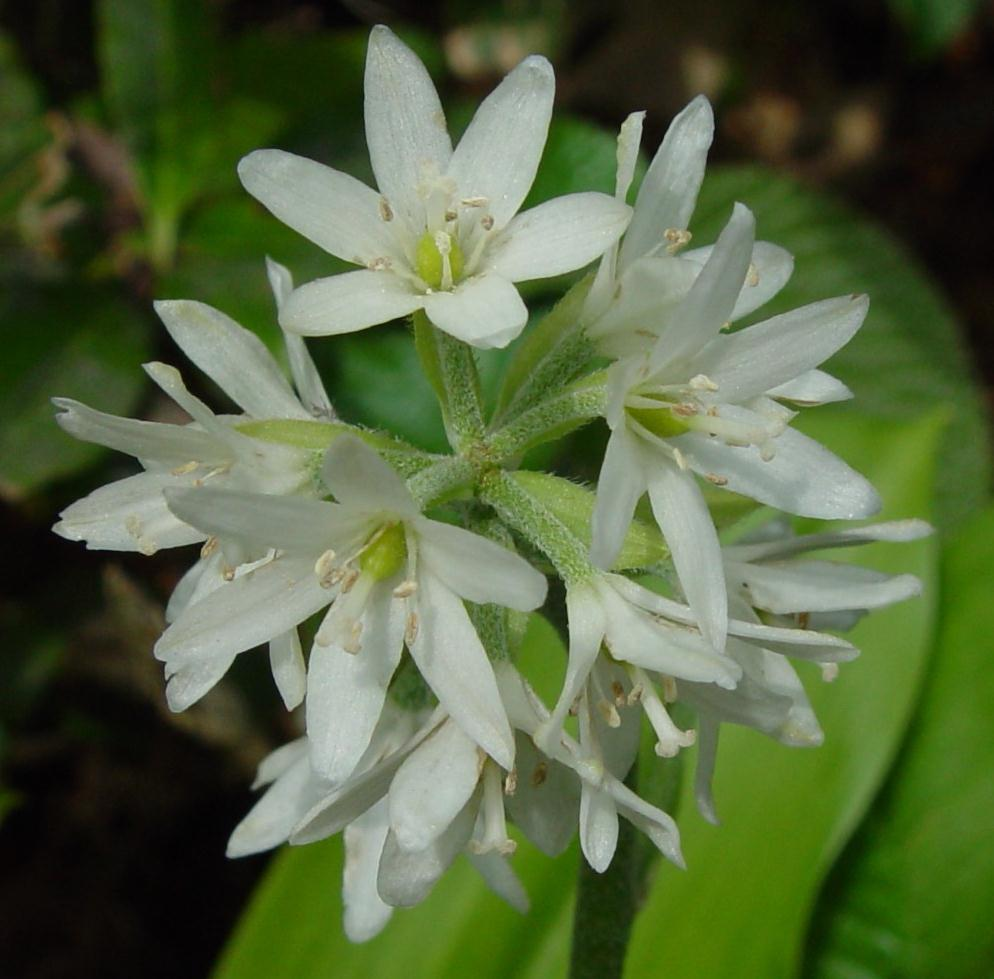
Flowers (Mount Choshi, Japan, 13 June)

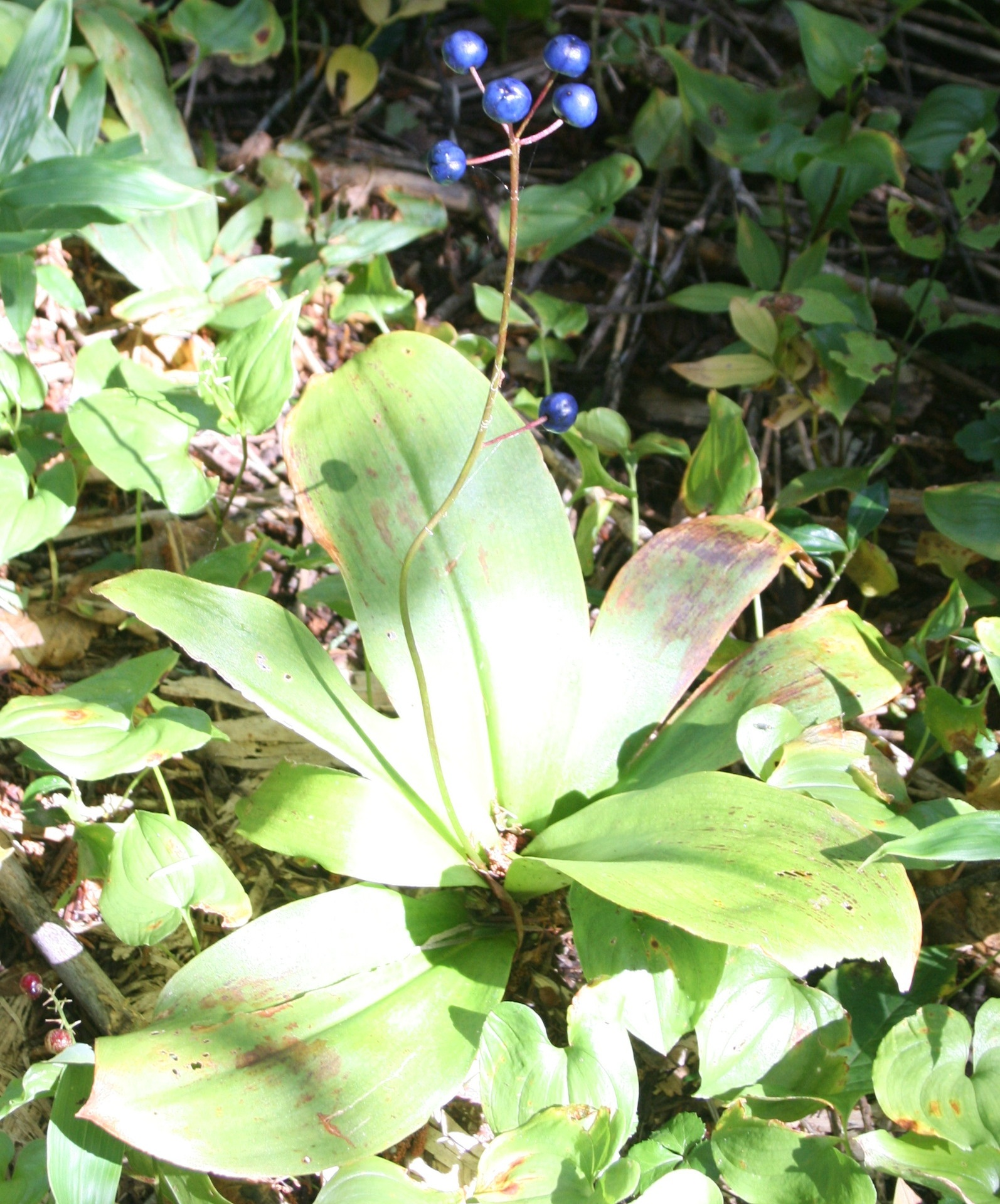
Fruiting plant with ripe fruit (Kiso Mountains, Japan, 23 September)

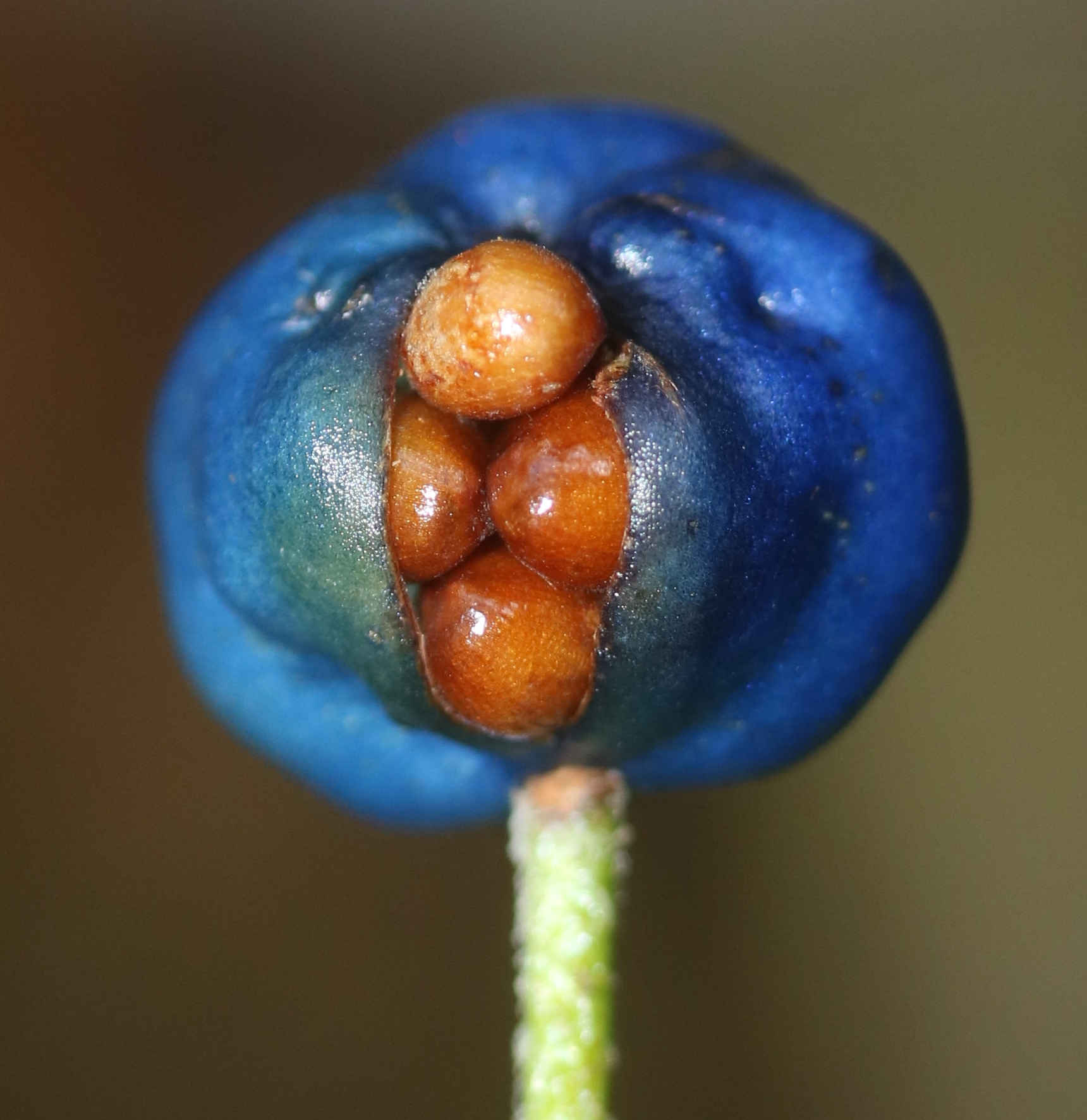
Fruit and seeds (Hida Mountains, Japan, 14 August)

== Taxonomy ==
Clintonia udensis was first described by Ernst Rudolf von Trautvetter and Carl Anton von Meyer in 1856. The specific epithet udensis, which means "from the River Uda or the Uden district of Siberia", evidently refers to a region in the Russian Far East where the plant is known to occur.

As of September 2020, Plants of the World Online accepts the following infraspecific names:

- Clintonia udensis var. alpina (Kunth ex Baker) H.Hara
- Clintonia udensis var. udensis

The word alpina means "of upland or mountainous regions". Indeed, members of C. u. var. alpina are exclusively found above 3,200 m (10,499 ft) in the Himalayas.

Some authorities do not accept the above infraspecific names. The claim is that there are no morphological characters that consistently separate the two varieties.

== Distribution ==
Clintonia udensis is wide-ranging, from the Russian Far East to southeast Asia, extending east-west from the Kuril Islands in the Pacific Ocean to the Western Himalaya region.

- Bhutan
- China: Gansu, Hebei, Heilongjiang, Henan, Hubei, Jilin, Liaoning, Shaanxi, Shanxi, Sichuan, Tibet Autonomous Region (Xizang), Yunnan
- India: Assam, Sikkim, Uttarakhand
- Japan
- Korea
- Myanmar (Burma)
- Nepal
- Russia: Amur Oblast, Khabarovsk Krai, Kuril Islands, Primorsky Krai, Sakhalin

C. u. var. alpina is found in the Himalayas (from Uttarakhand to Bhutan), Assam, northern Myanmar, and western China.

== Bibliography ==
- Trautvetter, Ernst Rudolf von; Meyer, Carl Anton von (1856). Florula Ochotensis Phaenogama. St. Petersburg: K. Akademia der Wissenschaften.
- Gledhill, David (2008). The Names of Plants (4th ed.). Cambridge University Press. ISBN 978-0-521-86645-3.
