= Night of the Corn People =

Studio album by The Bags
- Released: August, 1991 (CD); January, 1992 (Double LP)
- Genre: Hard rock, punk rock
- Length: 72:20
- Label: Stanton Park (CD); Helter Skelter (Double LP)

The Bags chronology
| The Bags (1990) | Night of the Corn People (1991) | Sharpen Your Sticks (2005) |

Night of the Corn People is the fourth album by The Bags. It was released in 1991 on CD by the Stanton Park music label, the first CD release by the band. A yellow and green vinyl double-LP edition was released the following year by the Italian Helter Skelter Records. Its first disc comprises 12 tracks. The second disc includes the seven-track rock opera "Waiting for Maloney" and bonus tracks.

The album was re-released in 2006 on the Oaf Records label.

In 2007, "The Mole" was featured on the film Air Guitar Nation. "I Smell a Rat" has been covered by Sebadoh.

== Track listing ==
Compact Disc
| No. | Title | Length |
|---|---|---|
| 1. | "Amsterdamned" | 3:59 |
| 2. | "The Mole" | 2:49 |
| 3. | "September" | 3:42 |
| 4. | "A Pile of Money" | 2:15 |
| 5. | "Covered Up" | 3:24 |
| 6. | "Who's Laughing Now" | 3:26 |
| 7. | "Naked Lady" | 3:21 |
| 8. | "I Smell a Rat" | 1:47 |
| 9. | "Movin' to the Country" | 5:47 |
| 10. | "Barb Jones" | 4:16 |
| 11. | "L. Frank Baum" | 5:49 |
| 12. | "Matter of Time" | 3:27 |
| 13. | "Hey Maloney" | 3:23 |
| 14. | "The Shower" | 1:08 |
| 15. | "Refrigerator Song" | 1:54 |
| 16. | "In My Headphones" | 1:29 |
| 17. | "Meanwhile" | 2:38 |
| 18. | "Maloney's Trip" | 8:13 |
| 19. | "The Grand Mythooza" | 3:44 |
| 20. | "Dr. Lb." | 2:13 |
| 21. | "Frilly Underwear" | 3:36 |

Double LP
| No. | Title | Length |
