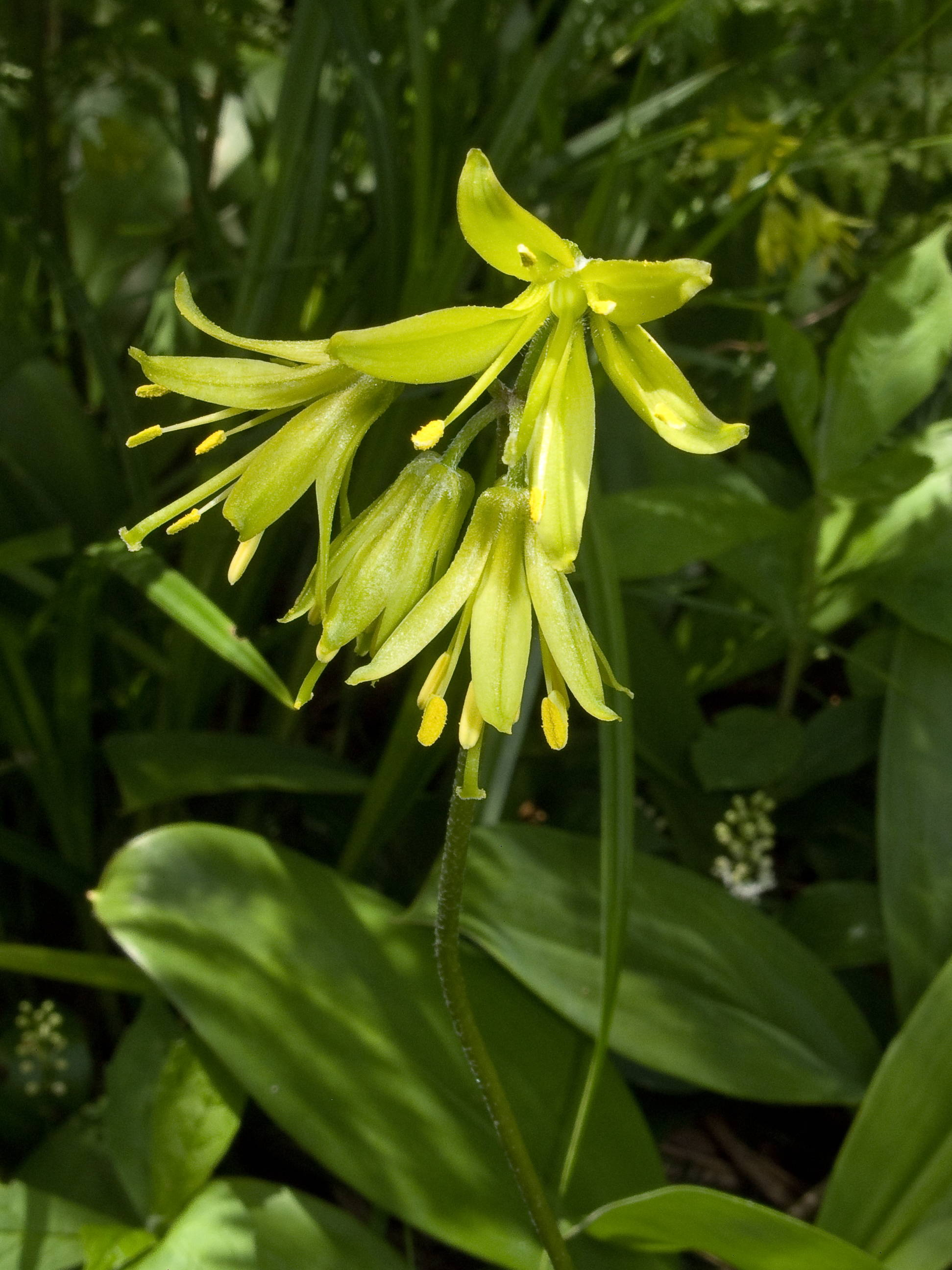
- Growing on Mont Tremblant, Quebec

Conservation status
- Secure (NatureServe)

Scientific classification
- Kingdom: Plantae
- Clade: Tracheophytes
- Clade: Angiosperms
- Clade: Monocots
- Order: Liliales
- Family: Liliaceae
- Subfamily: Lilioideae
- Genus: Clintonia
- Species: C. borealis

Binomial name
- Clintonia borealis (Aiton) Raf.

Synonyms
- Synonymy: Clintonia aitonii Raf.; Clintonia angustifolia Raf.; Clintonia biflora Raf.; Clintonia biumbella Raf.; Clintonia borealis f. albicarpa Killip ex House; Clintonia borealis f. lateralis Peck; Clintonia ciliata Raf.; Clintonia falcata Raf.; Clintonia fulva Raf.; Clintonia glomerata Raf.; Clintonia latifolia Raf.; Clintonia multiflora Raf.; Clintonia mutans Raf.; Clintonia nutans var. 'dasistema' Raf.; Clintonia nutans var. 'fascicularis' Raf.; Clintonia nutans var. 'macrostema' Raf.; Clintonia nutans var. 'obovata' Raf.; Clintonia nutans var. 'prolifera' Raf.; Clintonia nutans var. 'uniflora' Raf.; Clintonia ophioglossoides Raf.; Clintonia triflora Raf.; Clintonia undulata Raf.; Convallaria borealis (Aiton) Poir.; Dracaena borealis Aiton; Smilacina borealis (Aiton) Ker Gawl.

= Clintonia borealis =

Species of flowering plant

Clintonia borealis is a species of flowering plant in the lily family. The specific epithet borealis means "of the north," which alludes to the fact that the species tends to thrive in the boreal forests of eastern Canada and northeastern United States. It is commonly known as bluebead, blue bead-lily, or yellow clintonia.

== Description ==
Clintonia borealis is a small (5–10 in) perennial plant, usually found in homogeneous colonies. At full growth, a shoot has 2–4 clasping and curved, slightly succulent leaves with parallel venation. The flowers are arranged in small umbels at the extremity of a long stalk. They have 6 stamens and 6 yellow tepals (i.e. very similar sepals and petals). In rare cases more than one umbel is found on a shoot or shoots from a clone. The fruits are small luridly blue berries, which are semi-poisonous. A white-berried form (f. albicarpa) also exists.

The plant reproduces via seed or vegetatively by underground rhizomes. By either method, the plants are slow to spread. One colony often covers several hundred square meters.

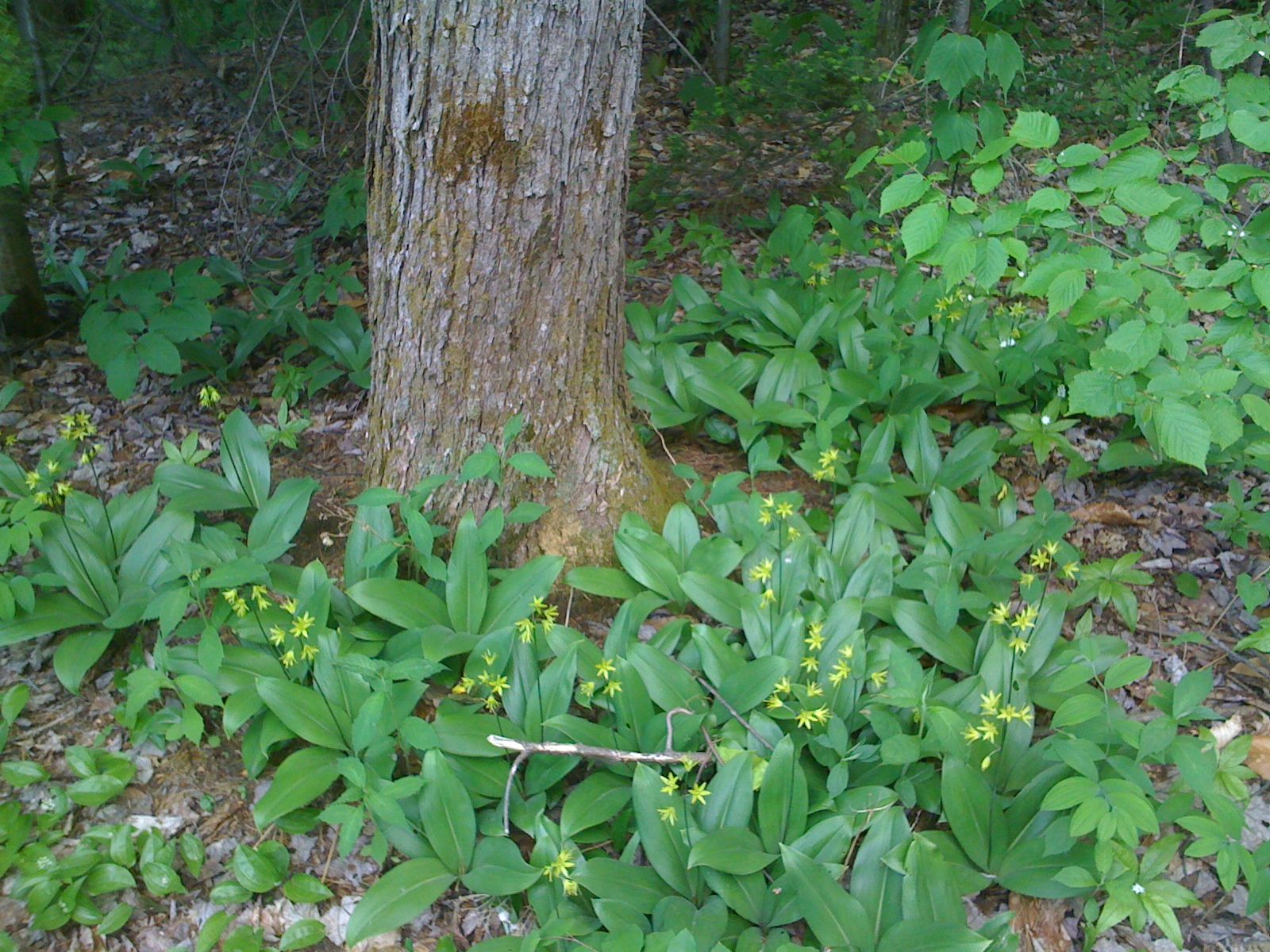
Flowering in habitat, Mille-Isles, Quebec

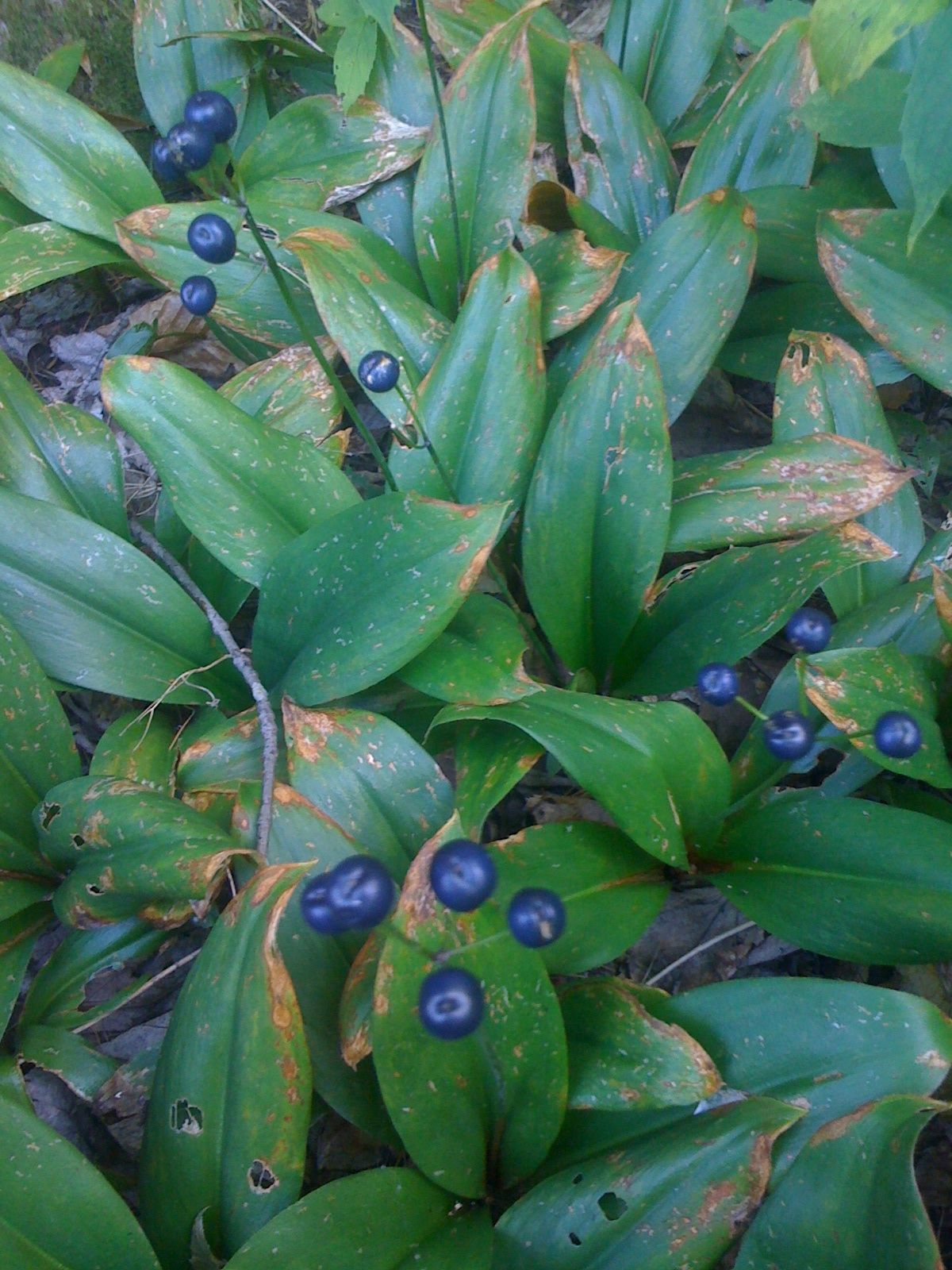
Fruiting in habitat, Mille-Isles, Quebec

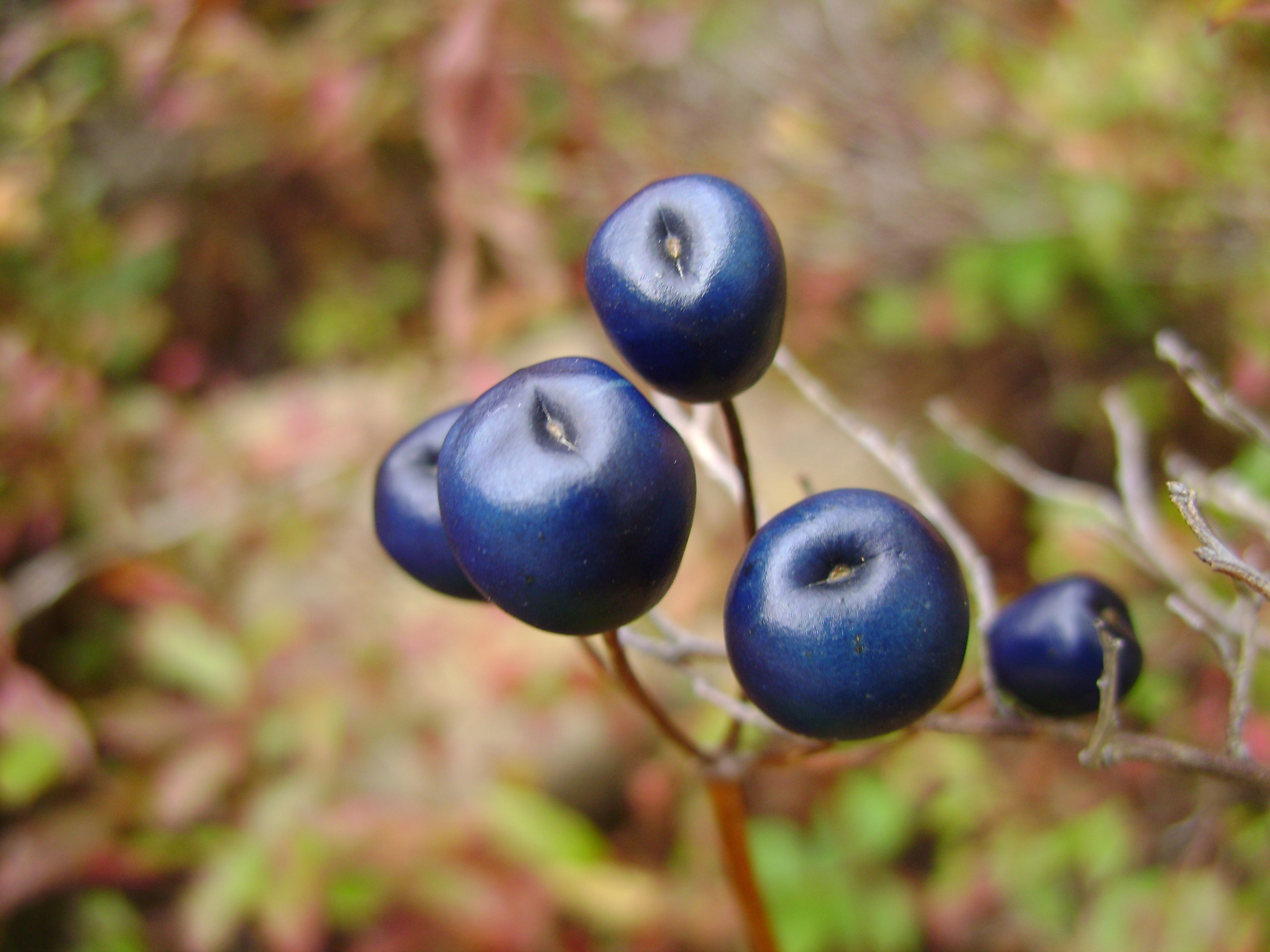
Fruits

== Taxonomy ==
In 1789, William Aiton described the species Dracaena borealis Aiton, a name that was to become a synonym for Clintonia borealis (Aiton) Raf. The latter was first described by Constantine Samuel Rafinesque in 1832. Rafinesque also described the genus Clintonia in 1818. The species C. borealis was previously classified within the genus Convallaria.

=== Names ===
The name bluebead is used as the common name for Clintonia borealis by the USDA Natural Resources Conservation Service, but the Database of Vascular Plants of Canada (VASCAN) prefers yellow clintonia. Other common names include blue bead-lily and corn-lily. The term 'bluebead' refers to the plant's quite toxic small blue spherical fruits, a quite striking feature. Though the name corn-lily is well known, it is also used as a common name for many other plants. (See Corn lily) Likewise, though it is occasionally called poisonberry or snakeberry many other species are also known as this. (See Poisonberry and Snakeberry) Other names include Clinton's lily, yellow bead lily, and yellow bluebead-lily.

Regionally, in the southern United States it is called balsam-bell. In state of New Hampshire it is called bear-plum and Canada-mayflower. In both Maine and Massachusetts it is wild lily-of-the-valley and dragoness-plant and heal-all in Massachusetts and New Brunswick. The greatest number of common names is in Maine where it is known as bear-tongue, bear's corn, calf-corn, dogberry, hound's-tongue, northern-lily, and wild-corn. Additionally it is cow-tongue in Maine and New Brunswick.

== Distribution ==
Clintonia borealis is a wide-ranging species in eastern North America, from Newfoundland and Labrador across New England into the Great Lakes region west to Manitoba and Minnesota. Its range extends southward into the Appalachian Mountains where it is allopatric with C. umbellulata, that is, the ranges of the two species do not significantly overlap but are immediately adjacent to one another. In the Appalachians, C. umbellulata prefers hardwood forests less than 1,000 m (3,281 ft) while C. borealis populates coniferous or mixed forests up to 1,600 m (5,249 ft).

C. borealis is globally secure but threatened in Maryland and Tennessee. It is an endangered species in Ohio and Indiana.

== Ecology ==
Clintonia borealis is not found in open spaces, only growing in the shade. It is extremely slow to spread, but established clones can usually survive many later modifications, as long as sunlight remains limited. Whereas crossed pollination is more efficient in producing seeds, self-pollination will still produce seeds, allowing the plant to propagate.

Like other slow-growing forest plants, such as Trillium species, Clintonia is extremely sensitive to grazing by white-tailed deer.

=== Cultivation ===
Culture is difficult, due to the need to avoid direct sunlight and the difficulty posed by germination. Transplanting is not recommended.

== Usage ==
=== Medicine ===
The rhizome contains diosgenin, a saponin steroid with estrogenic effects.

=== Food ===
The young leaves of the plant are edible while still only a few inches tall. The fruit however, is mildly toxic, and is quite unpleasant tasting.

== Folklore ==
Hunters in North Quebec were said to have rubbed their traps with the roots because bears are attracted to its odor.

According to a Mi'kmaq tale, when a grass snake eats a poisonous toad, it slithers in rapid circles around a shoot of the bluebead lily to transfer the poison to the plant.

== See also ==
- Bead lily
- List of plants known as lily

== Bibliography ==
- Lamoureux, Gisèle (2002). Flore printanière. Fleurbec. ISBN 2-920174-15-0.
