= Bushmanland =

Bushmanland (Boesmanland in Afrikaans) may refer to:

- Bushmanland (South West Africa), a bantustan in South West Africa (present-day Namibia)
- Bushmanland, Northern Cape, an area south of the Orange River and west of Kenhardt and east of Springbok (Namaqualand) in the Northern Cape, South Africa
