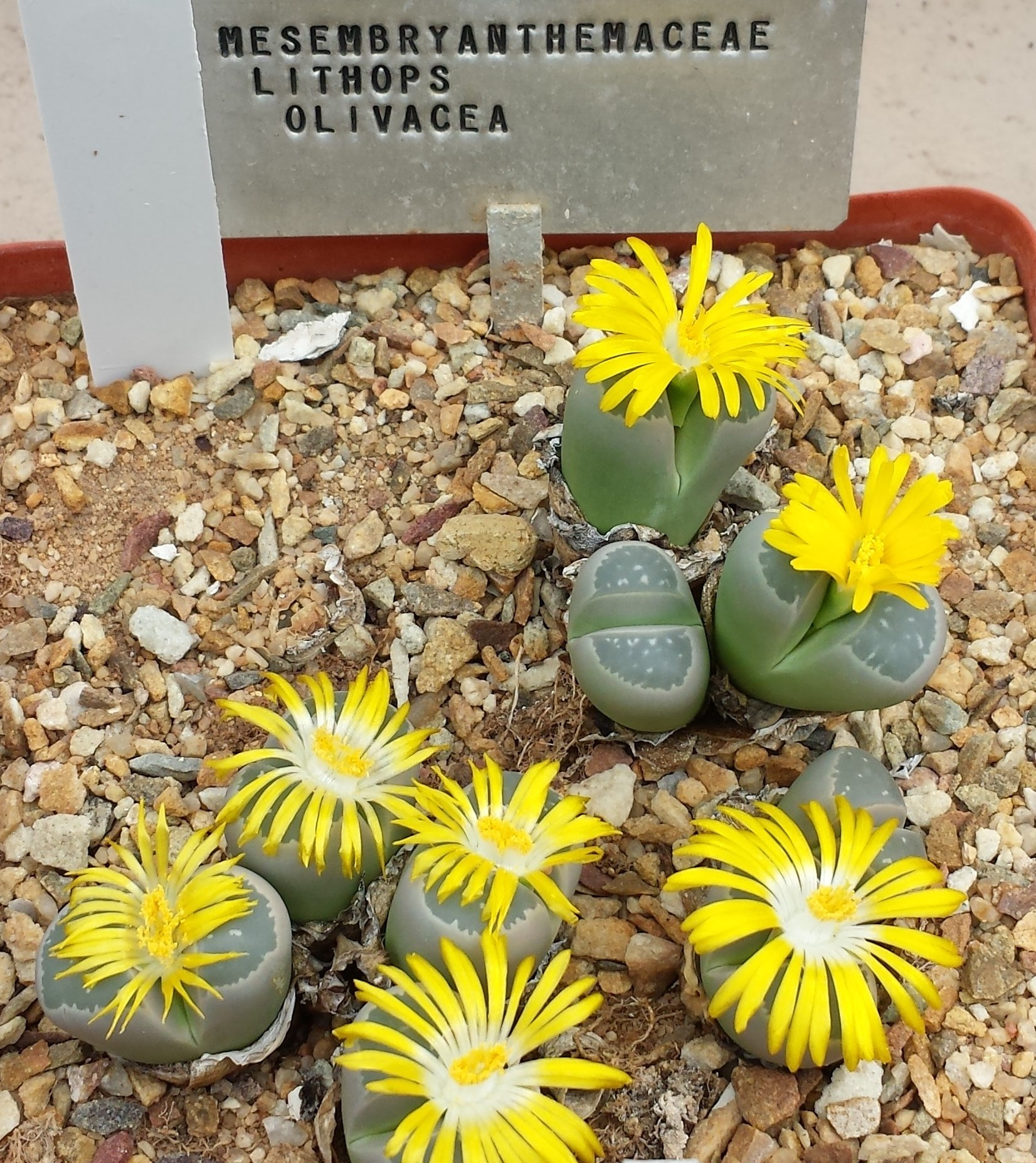

Scientific classification
- Kingdom: Plantae
- Clade: Tracheophytes
- Clade: Angiosperms
- Clade: Eudicots
- Order: Caryophyllales
- Family: Aizoaceae
- Genus: Lithops
- Species: L. olivacea

Binomial name
- Lithops olivacea L.Bolus

= Lithops olivacea =

Species of succulent

Lithops olivacea is a species of the genus Lithops under the family Aizoaceae. The name olivacea refers to the Latin word for olive (oliva) combined with the suffix -cea, meaning "of the likeness", producing the idea of "olive likeness". Lithops olivacea grow primarily in the Bushmanland of South Africa. They grow most abundantly in the regions of Aggeneys, Pofadder, and Namies. L. olivacea also received the Royal Horticultural Society's Award of Garden Merit for being "excellent for ordinary use in appropriate conditions, available to buy, of good constitution, essentially stable in form & colour, [and] reasonably resistant to pests & diseases."

== Description ==
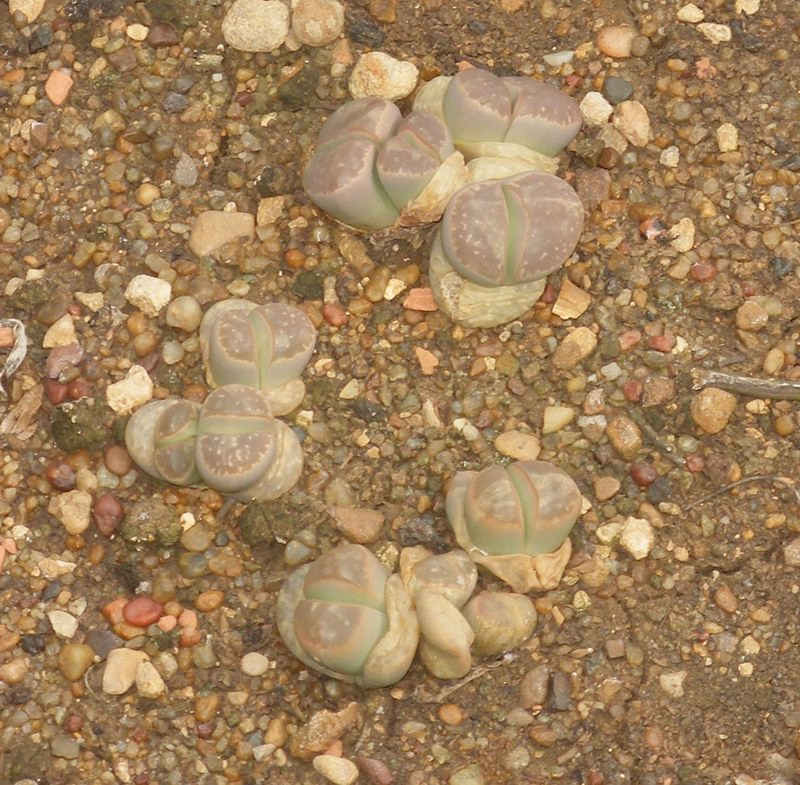
Lithops olivacea

The plant consists of bulbous leaves growing in pairs. Flowers will emerge from between the two leaves and sprout vertically. The leaves draw down into a small taproot which also grows adventitious roots when able. The flowers are yellow in color, and have a white center. L. olivacea usually tends to grow near large deposits and formations of quartz for reasons of adapted camouflage. Variety in the species allows for colors to range from red, to green, to yellow, to brown or gray, depending on environment or genetic traits.
