= Amaryllis (band) =

Polish rock band

- Amaryllis in 2011. From left to right: Szymon Guzowski, Łukasz Kulczak, Ewa Domagała, Marek Domagała, Bartłomiej Stankowski, Henryk Kasperczak

Background information
- Origin: Prudnik, Poznań, Poland
- Genres: progressive rock; progressive metal; early music
- Years active: 2004–present
- Members: Ewa Domagała; Marek Domagała; Henryk Kasperczak; Kacper Stachowiak; Łukasz Kulczak; Szymon Guzowski; Bartłomiej Stankowski
- Past members: Wojciech Bielejewski; Grzegorz Dziamka; Jacek Winkiel
- Website: amaryllis.pl

Amaryllis is a Polish progressive rock band, founded in 2004 in Prudnik by Ewa Domagała and Marek Domagała.

== History ==
The band was founded in Prudnik at the turn of 2004 and 2005. Its name comes from the only genus in the subtribe Amaryllidinae, Amaryllis. Some time later, a lutenist and theorbist Henryk Kasperczak, bassist Wojciech Bielejewski, drummer Grzegorz Dziamka and keyboardist Jacek Winkiel joined the band.

In 2005 Amaryllis, as a septet, released its first demo. In the Autumn of the same year, Piotr Jackowiak became the manager of the band. At the turn of 2005 and 2006, drummer Kacper Stachowiak, bassist Szymon Guzowski and keyboardist Bartłomiej Stankowiak joined the band.

In the summer of 2006 the band played its first live shows. At that time, Ewa Domagała was temporarily replaced by different vocalists due to her pregnancy. She returned to the group in October. After her return, Amaryllis started to work on their first single "Prologos". Its premiere took place on 13 December 2006 during a concert in Blue Note club in Poznań.

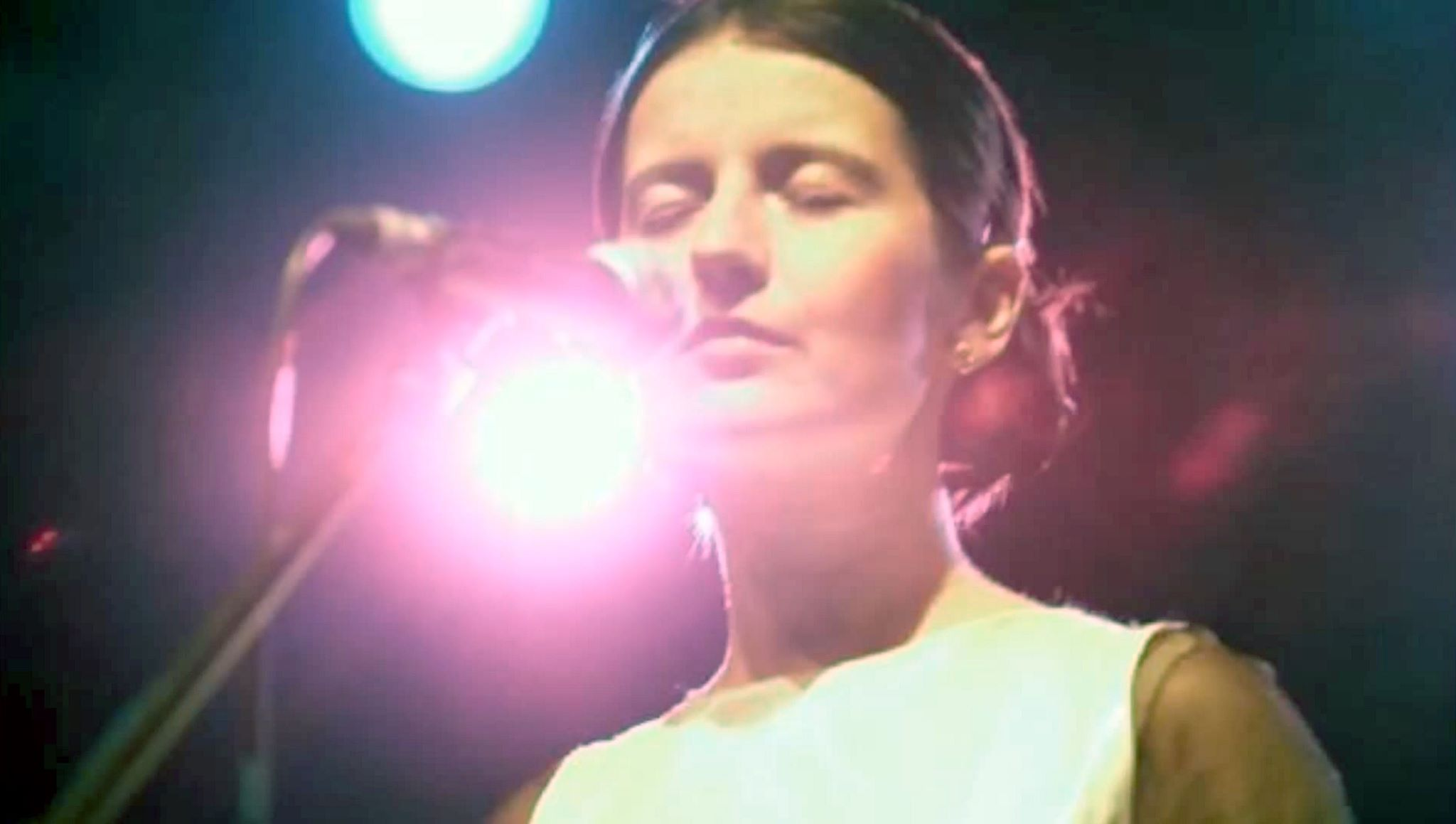
Ewa Domagała

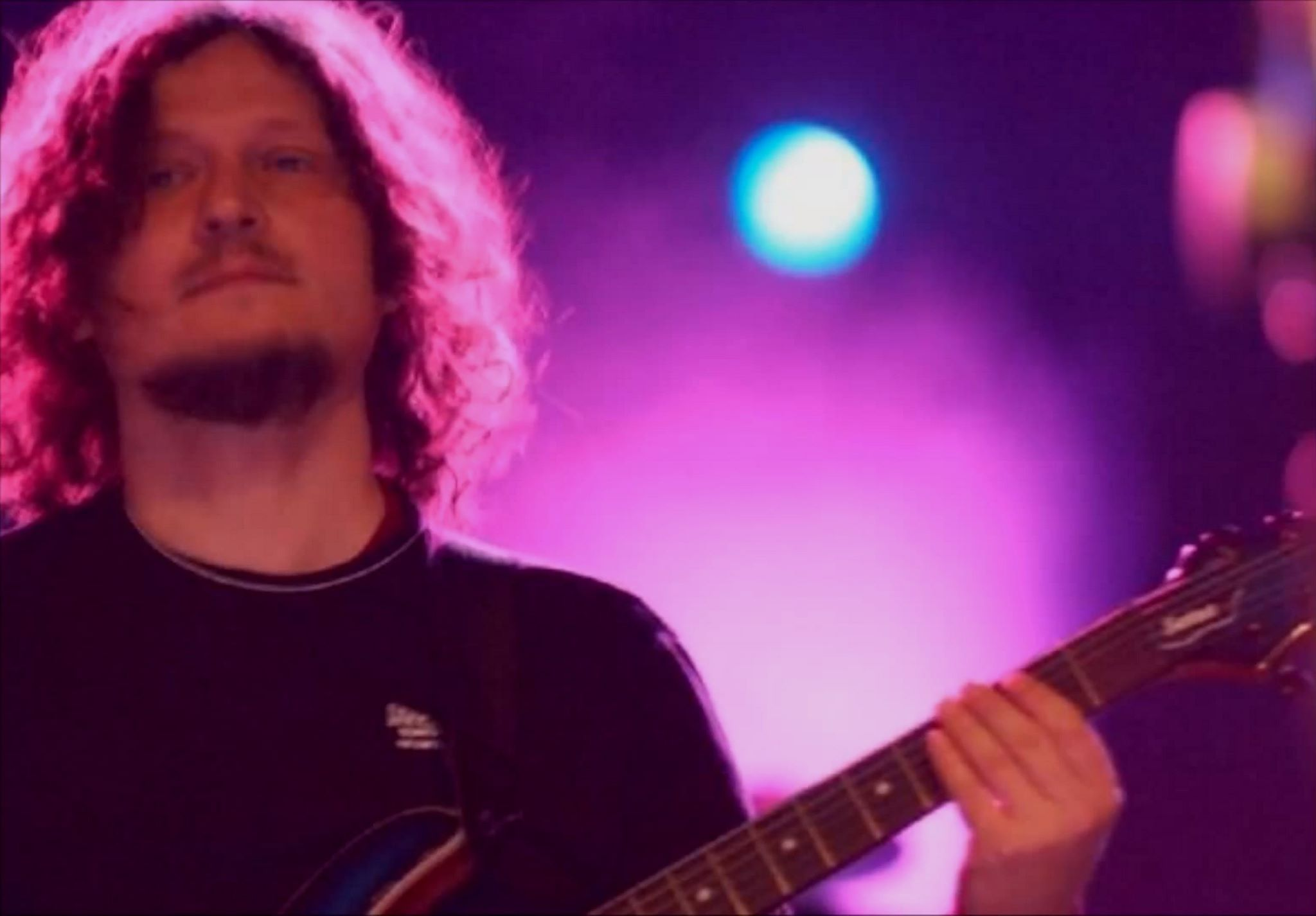
Marek Domagała

In May 2007 the band won a Grand Prix of Spring Rock Festival, and in June they won Song of Songs Festival in Toruń. Thanks to that, they were able to record their first music video for the song "Abyssus". It was recorded in 2008 by Rafał Jerzak.

On 17 September 2009 Amaryllis released their first studio album titled Inquietum Est Cor.

In 2010 the band participated in eliminations to Woodstock Festival Poland in Kostrzyn nad Odrą and got into semi-finals in Gdynia.

== Musical style and lyrics ==
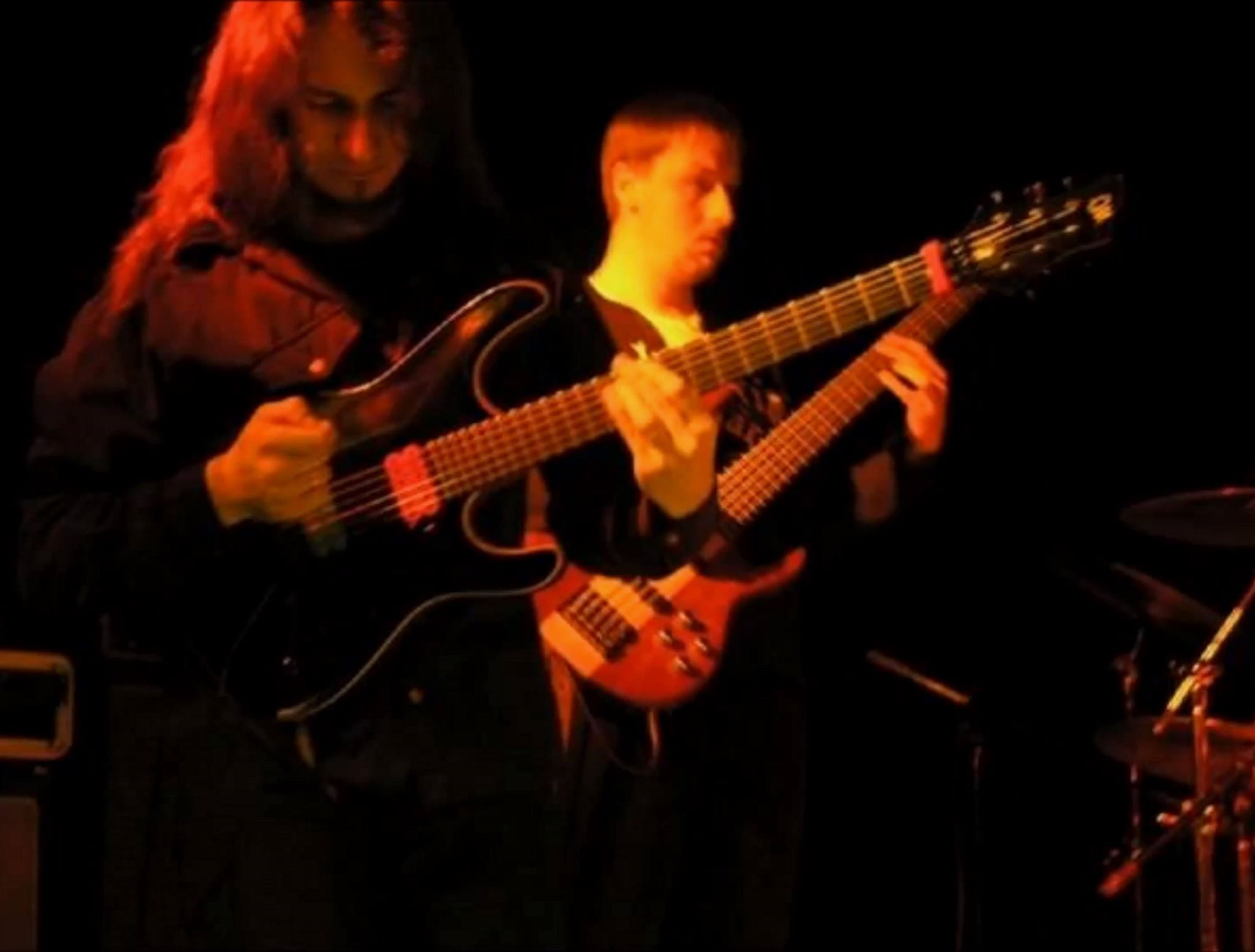
Łukasz Kulczak and Szymon Guzowski

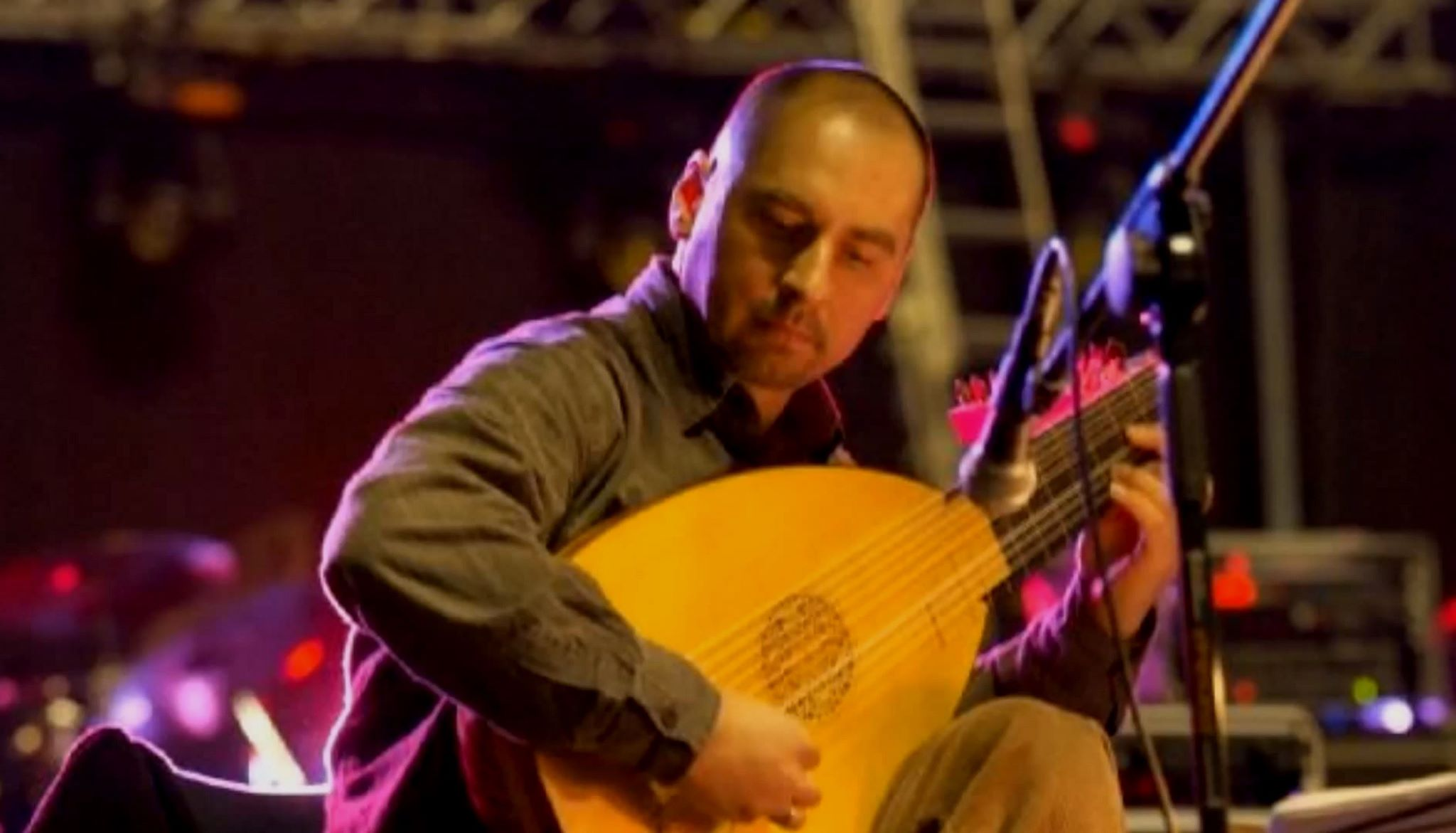
Henryk Kasperczak

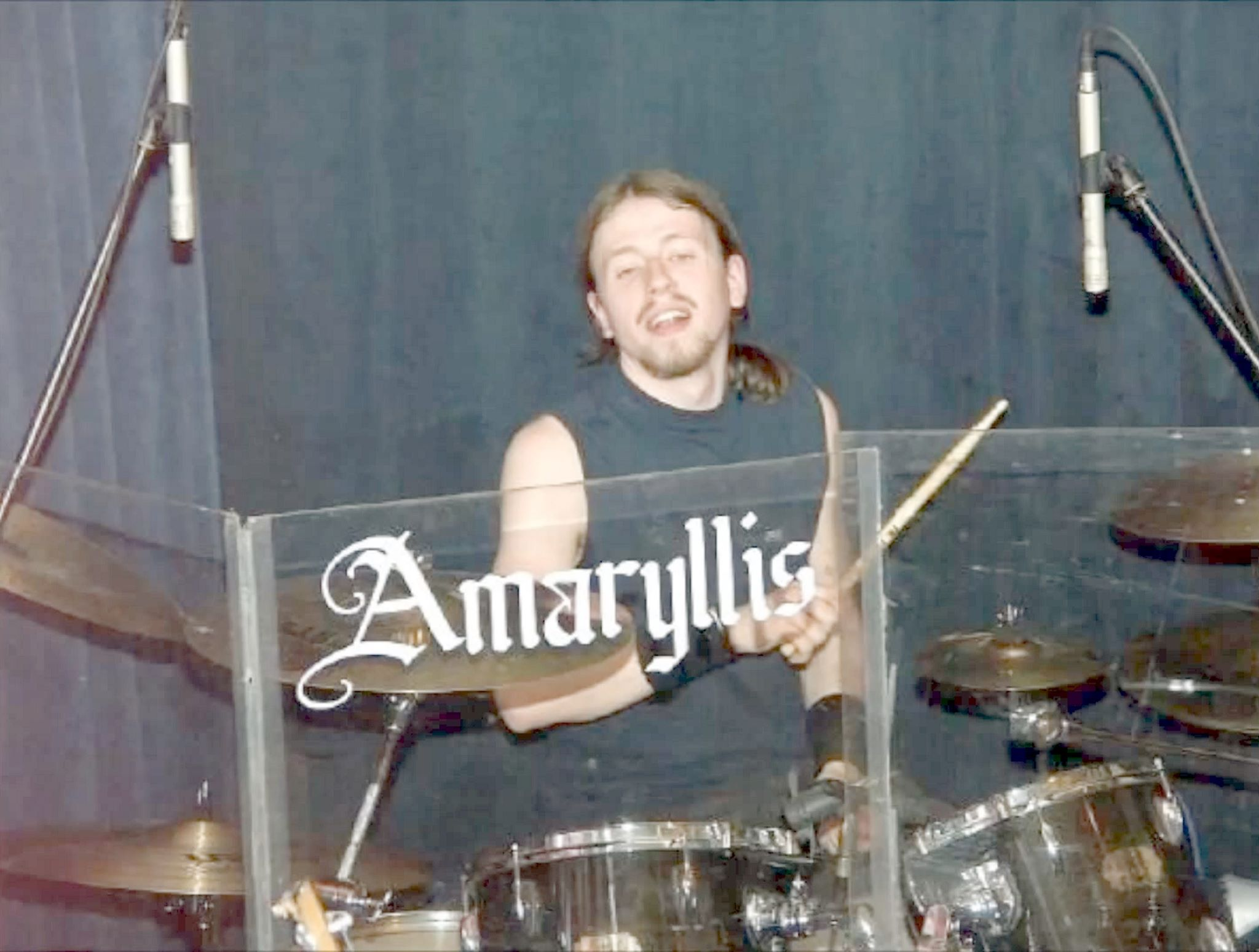
Kacper Stachowiak

All of their texts are written in Latin. The lyrics of the band are characterized by the treatment of Christianity. Amaryllis, however, do not consider themselves a religious band. Amaryllis is considered to be the first rock band to sing entirely in Latin.

The music is inspired by the early religious music.

The band states that their main influences are Rush and Frankie Goes to Hollywood.

== Personnel ==
=== Final lineup ===
- Ewa Domagała – vocals
- Marek Domagała – guitar
- Henryk Kasperczak – lute, theorbo
- Kacper Stachowiak – drums
- Łukasz Kulczak – guitar
- Szymon Guzowski – bass guitar
- Bartłomiej Stankowski – keyboard

=== Former members ===
- Wojciech Bielejewski – bass guitar
- Grzegorz Dziamka – drums
- Jacek Winkiel – keyboard

== Discography ==
Amaryllis wordmark

- Demo (2005)
- Prologos (single; 2006)
- Abyssus (single; 2008)
- Inquietum Est Cor (2009)
