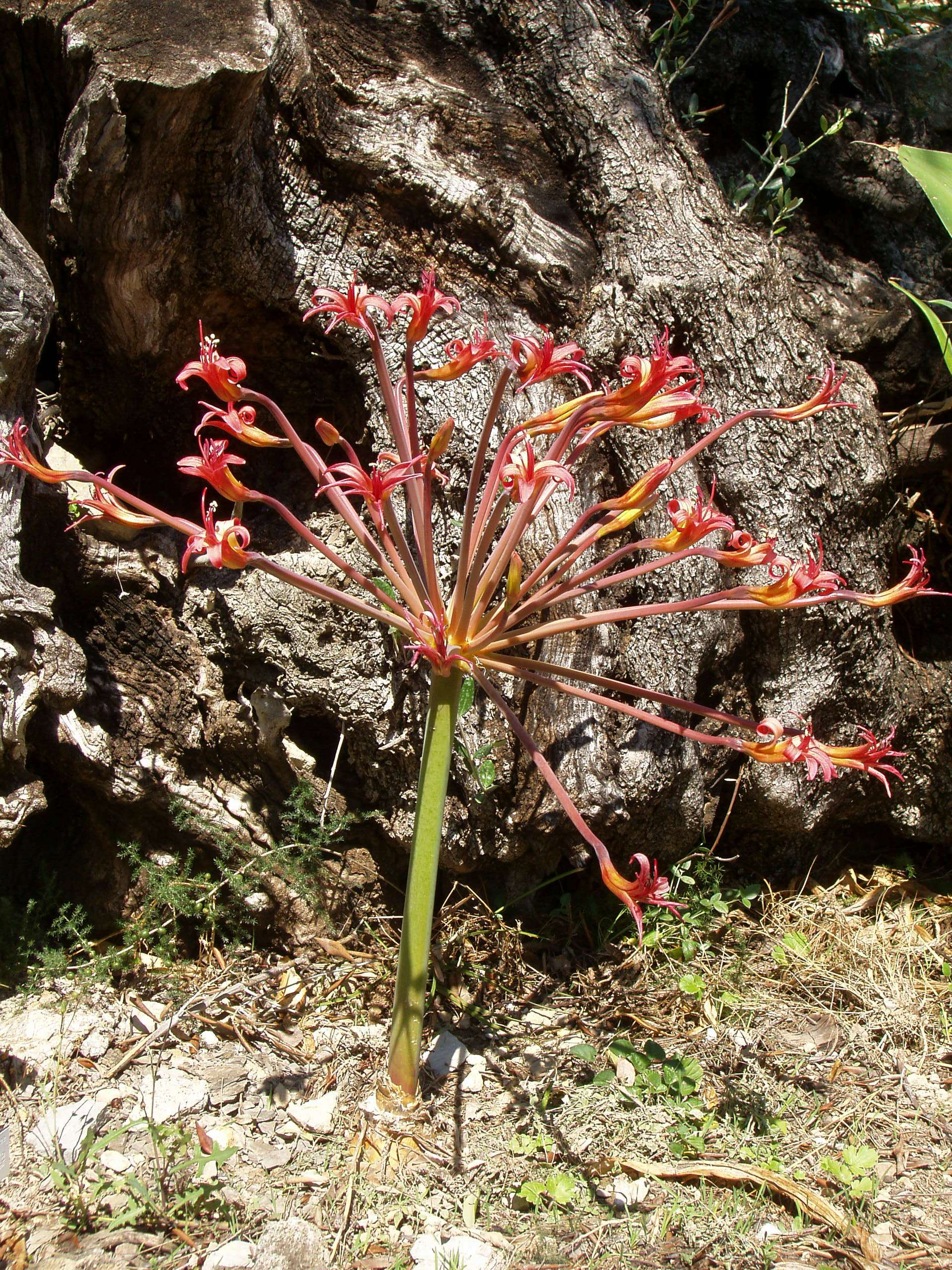
- Brunsvigia josephinae

Scientific classification
- Kingdom: Plantae
- Clade: Tracheophytes
- Clade: Angiosperms
- Clade: Monocots
- Order: Asparagales
- Family: Amaryllidaceae
- Subfamily: Amaryllidoideae
- Genus: Brunsvigia; Heist.

Synonyms
- Brunsuigia Heist., alternate spelling

= Brunsvigia =

Genus of flowering plants

Brunsvigia is a genus of African flowering plants in the family Amaryllidaceae, subfamily Amaryllidoideae. It contains about 20 species native to southeastern and southern Africa from Tanzania to the Cape Provinces of South Africa.

== Description ==
=== Vegetative characteristics ===
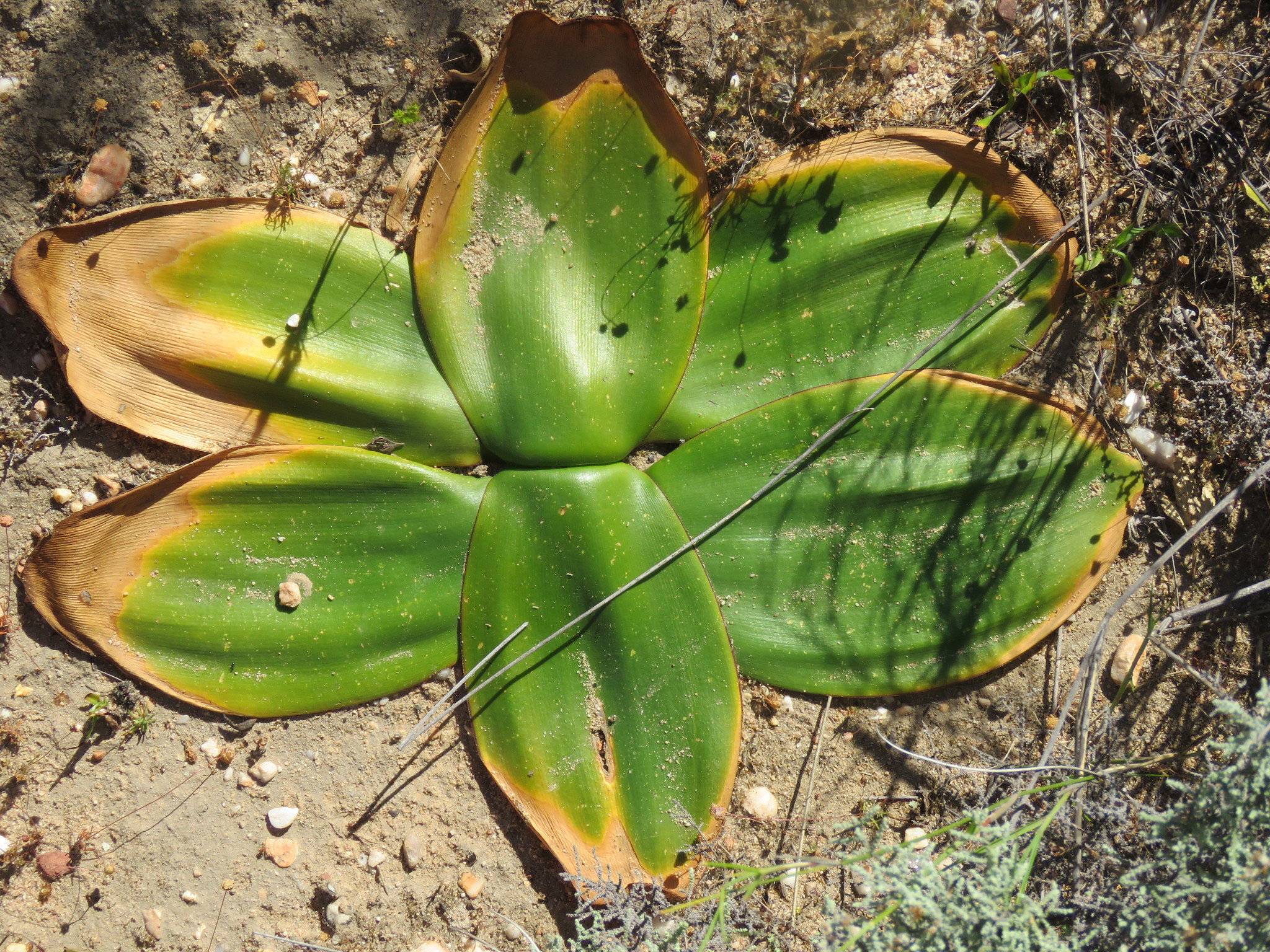
Smooth foliage of Brunsvigia orientalis

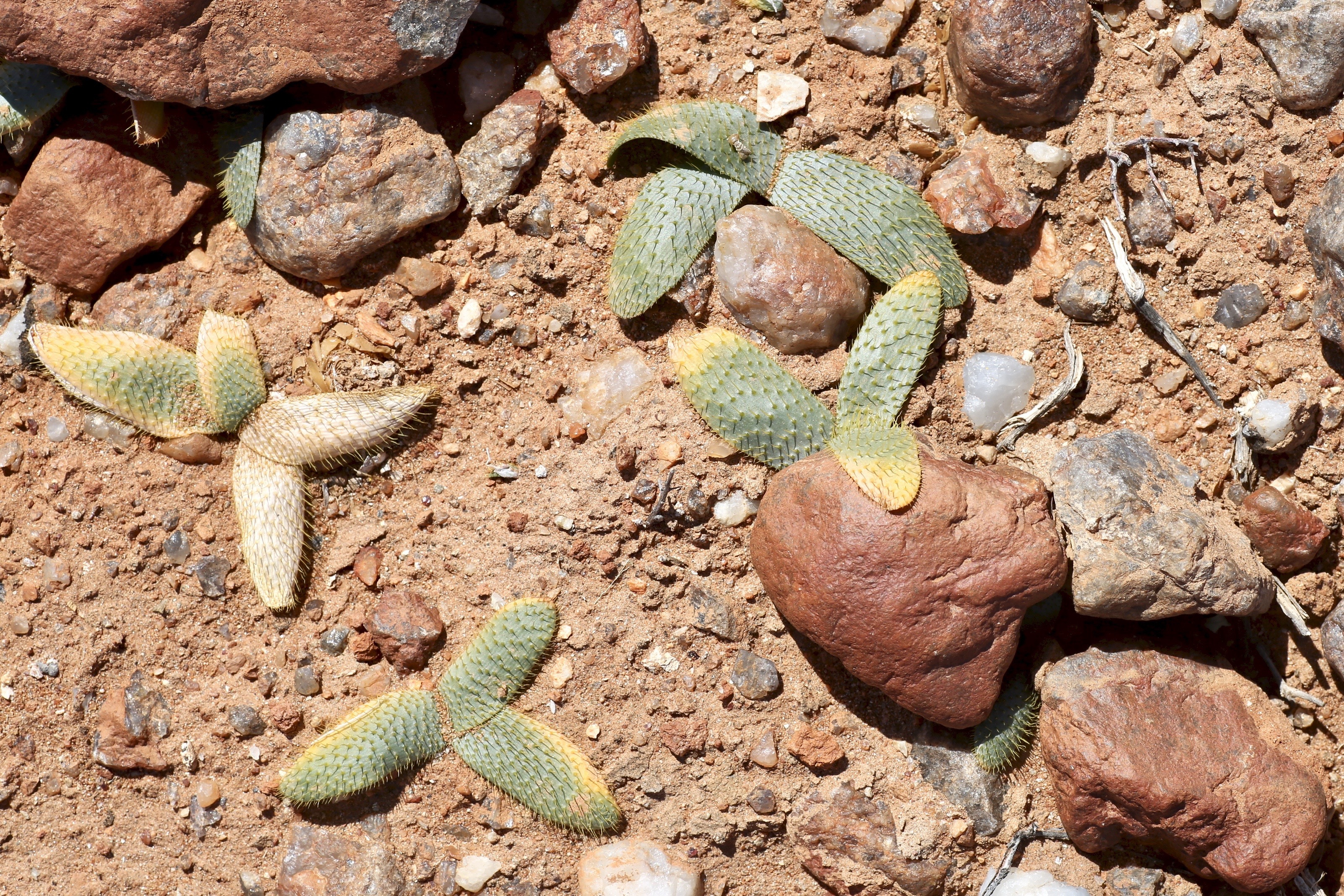
Bristly foliage of Brunsvigia namaquana

Brunsvigia are perennial, deciduous, temperate, bulbous herbal plants. Most species have subterranean bulbs but they are usually half-exposed in B. herrei and B. josephinae. Bulbs are tender, usually large (up to 20 cm diameter), winter-growing and summer-dormant, generally flowering in early autumn. Tunics are often thick and cartilaginous, typically brittle and tan-coloured, although they are brown and papery in B. josephinae and B. litoralis.

The leaves are annual; when mature, the leaves are broad and oblong to tongue-shaped. In species with small bulbs – B. radula, B. comptonii, and B. namaquana – there are just two or three leaves per plant but most other species have at least four leaves per bulb. B. josephinae has the distinction of producing as many as 20 leaves. The leaves mostly lie flat on the ground and sometimes press down so firmly that they lie vertically if the bulb is dug up. Only in B. litoralis, B. josephinae, B. grandiflora, B. undulata and B. herrei do the leaves stand clear of the ground. Although usually smooth, the upper leaf surfaces of two Namaqualand species (B. radula and B. namaquana) are covered with straw-coloured bristles and in some populations of B. striata from the southern Cape, they bear soft, scale-like hairs. In the winter rainfall region of southern Africa, the foliage is produced after the flowering heads have been shed, whereas in the summer rainfall region the vegetative and flowering stages often overlap.

=== Generative characteristics ===
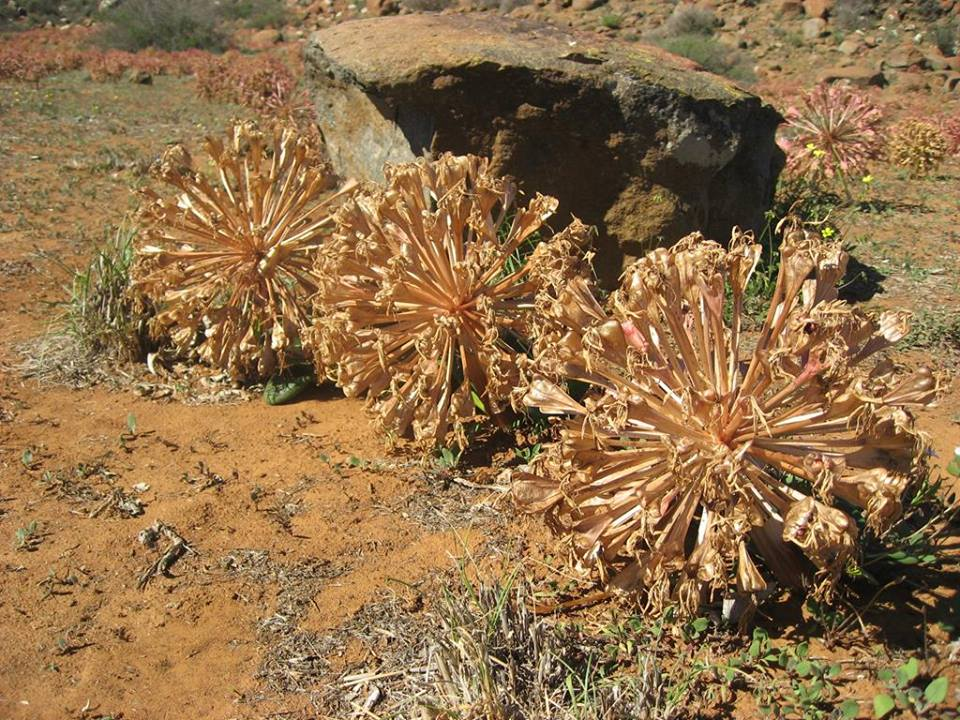
Infructescences of Brunsvigia bosmaniae

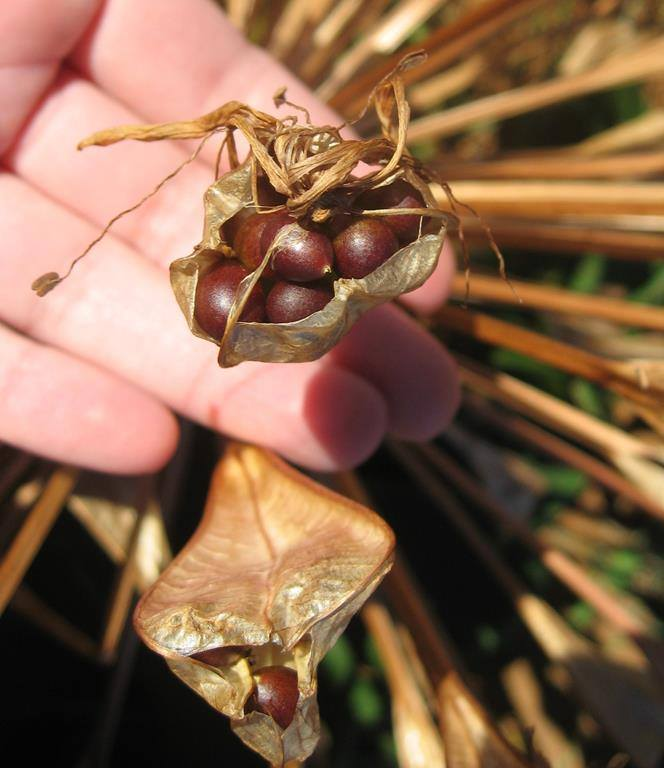
Seeds of Brunsvigia bosmaniae

The scape is firm, to 35 cm, deciduous and breaking at ground level in fruiting time.

The inflorescences, a few- to many-flowered umbels, are particularly conspicuous. In most species the pedicels are long, stiff, straight and radiate outwards to form an almost perfectly spherical head; they elongate and spread after blooming. However, B. litoralis, B. josephinae and B. orientalis differ in having pedicels that curve below each flower. Just three species (B. pulchra, B. marginata and B. elandsmontana) have compact, brush-like inflorescences. The flowers are zygomorphic or almost actinomorphic with short tube, segments spreading-recurved. The six tepals of each flower are free to the base or shortly fused into a tube. Radially symmetrical, trumpet-shaped flowers occur in species with compact, dense inflorescences, whereas bilaterally symmetrical flowers occur in species with open, lax heads. In B. comptonii, B. radula and B. namaquana the flowers are highly asymmetrical as all but one tepal curve upwards. Often the flowers are scented and all produce nectar. Their colour vary from ruby-red to brilliant scarlet or pale to bright pink and in some species the entire inflorescence is attractively coloured. Pink flowers are the norm, whereas red flowers are found in B. marginata, B. orientalis, B. litoralis and B. josephinae. Floral markings are often variable within species but dark veins on the tepals are characteristic for B. bosmaniae and B. gregaria. When in flower, the plants are spectacular but the flowering period is brief and restricted to summer and autumn.

Stamens clustered, arising from the perianth tube, ± declinate or erect, shortly connate at base. Stigma capitate, trilobate (three-lobed). Each locule has 3-10 superimposed ovules whose shape resembles a spinning top. Style filiform, declinate. The water-rich, non-dormant, ovoid, reddish green seeds are borne in large, dry capsules that are spindle-shaped or three-angled, obtuse or acute, transversally veined, and often heavily ribbed. Capsules are dehiscent loculicidally or breaking unevenly. Dehiscence in most species of Brunsvigia is somewhat tardy and confined to the apex of the capsule, hampered below by heavy ribs that keep the septa closed for most of their length.

== Cytology ==
The number of chromosomes is 2n = 22.

== Taxonomy ==
It was published by Lorenz Heister in 1755. The type species is not designated. The genus Brunsvigia was named after the House of Braunschweig [Brunswick]-Lüneburg, specifically honouring the Duke of Brunswick who promoted the study of plants, including the beautiful Cape species B. orientalis. The name was first used in 1753 by Lorenz Heister, a German surgeon and botanist, to describe a single bulb received in 1748 by Gustaaf Willem van Imhoff from Ryk Tulbagh at the Cape.

=== Species ===
Species:

Image	Scientific name	Distribution
	Brunsvigia bosmaniae F.M.Leight.	northwest and southwest Cape province
	Brunsvigia comptonii W.F.Barker	western Karoo
	Brunsvigia elandsmontana Snijman	Western Cape
	Brunsvigia gariepensis Snijman	Cape province
	Brunsvigia grandiflora Lindl.	Eastern Cape, KwaZulu-Natal, and the Free State.
	Brunsvigia gregaria R.A.Dyer	Cape province
	Brunsvigia herrei Leight. ex W.F.Barker	Namibia southward into Namaqualand.
	Brunsvigia josephinae (Delile) Ker Gawl.	western Cape to the western Karoo
	Brunsvigia kirkii Baker	Tanzania to Malawi.
	Brunsvigia litoralis R.A.Dyer	southeastern Cape
	Brunsvigia marginata (Jacq.) W.T.Aiton	western Cape.
	Brunsvigia namaquana D.Müll.-Doblies & U.Müll.-Doblies	Namaqualand.
	Brunsvigia natalensis Baker	South Africa
	Brunsvigia nervosa (Poir.) ined.	Cape province
	Brunsvigia orientalis (L.) Aiton ex Eckl.	Western Cape.
	Brunsvigia pulchra (W.F.Barker) D.Müll.-Doblies & U.Müll.-Doblies	Namaqualand
	Brunsvigia radula (Jacq.) W.T.Aiton	Namaqualand
	Brunsvigia radulosa Herb.	Eastern Cape and the Orange Free State.
	Brunsvigia striata (Jacq.) Aiton	Western Cape and Eastern Cape
	Brunsvigia undulata F.M.Leight.	Eastern Cape.

== Ecology ==
=== Pollination ===
Brunsvigia is the only genus of Amaryllideae in which several species have stout, somewhat tubular, brilliant scarlet, pink, or red flowers that are adapted to bird pollination.

=== Habitat ===
Brunsvigia occurs in semi-arid regions in sandy, well-draining soil. It occurs both in winter rainfall and summer rainfall regions.

== Conservation ==
Brunsvigia litoralis is endangered due to housing development, and invasive plants.

== Use ==
=== Horticulture ===
It has been used in intergeneric hybridisation with Amaryllis. Such hybrids are named × Amarygia.

== Bibliography ==
- R.A. Dyer, 1950: A review of the genus Brunsvigia. Plant Life 6: 63-83
- R.A. Dyer, 1951: A review of the genus Brunsvigia. Plant Life 7: 44-64
- C.A. Smith, 1966: Common names of South African plants. Memoirs of the Botanical Survey of South Africa No. 35. TheGovernment Printer, Pretoria
- R.S. Adamson, T.A. Salter (eds.), 1950: Flora of the Cape Peninsula. Juta, Cape Town and Johannesburg
- J. Manning, P. Goldblatt, 2000: Wild flowers of the fairest Cape. Red Roof Design in association with the Nationalotanical Institute, Cape Town
- E.G. Rice, R.H. Compton, 1950: Wild flowers of the Cape of Good Hope. The Botanical Society of SA, Cape Town
- A. Pauw, S. Johnson, 1999: Table Mountain: a natural history. Fernwood Press
- G.D. Duncan, 2000: Grow bulbs. Kirstenbosch Gardening Series, National Botanical Institute, Cape Town
- G.D. Duncan, 2002: Grow nerines. Kirstenbosch Gardening Series, National Botanical Institute, Cape Town
