= Brunsvigia gariepensis =

Scientific classification
- Kingdom: Plantae
- Clade: Tracheophytes
- Clade: Angiosperms
- Clade: Monocots
- Order: Asparagales
- Family: Amaryllidaceae
- Subfamily: Amaryllidoideae
- Genus: Brunsvigia
- Species: B. gariepensis

Binomial name
- Brunsvigia gariepensis Snijman

Species of flowering plant

Brunsvigia gariepensis, commonly known as the Gariep March lily, is a geophyte belonging to the Amaryllidaceae family. The species is endemic to the Northern Cape where the plant has a range of 260–680 km^{2} in the Bushmanland between Aggeneys and Pofadder. There are two known subpopulations, perhaps a third, and all are threatened by mining activities.
