= Brunsvigia comptonii =

Scientific classification
- Kingdom: Plantae
- Clade: Tracheophytes
- Clade: Angiosperms
- Clade: Monocots
- Order: Asparagales
- Family: Amaryllidaceae
- Subfamily: Amaryllidoideae
- Genus: Brunsvigia
- Species: B. comptonii

Binomial name
- Brunsvigia comptonii W.F.Barker

Species of flowering plant

Brunsvigia comptonii, commonly known as the Tankwa candelabra, is a geophyte belonging to the Amaryllidaceae family. The species is endemic to the Northern Cape and the Western Cape. It occurs from the Bushmanland to the Tankwa Karoo and Laingsburg. It is part of the Succulent Karoo vegetation.
