= Brunsvigia radula =

Scientific classification
- Kingdom: Plantae
- Clade: Tracheophytes
- Clade: Angiosperms
- Clade: Monocots
- Order: Asparagales
- Family: Amaryllidaceae
- Subfamily: Amaryllidoideae
- Genus: Brunsvigia
- Species: B. radula

Binomial name
- Brunsvigia radula (Jacq.) W.T.Aiton

Synonyms
- Amaryllis radula Jacq.; Coburgia radula (Jacq.) Herb. ex Steud.

Species of flowering plant

Brunsvigia radula is a geophyte belonging to the Amaryllidaceae family. The species is endemic to the Western Cape and occurs on the Knersvlakte where it is part of the vygieveld. It has a small distribution area of 64 km^{2} and there are five subpopulations. The plant is threatened by prospecting, mining activities and collection by horticulturists.
