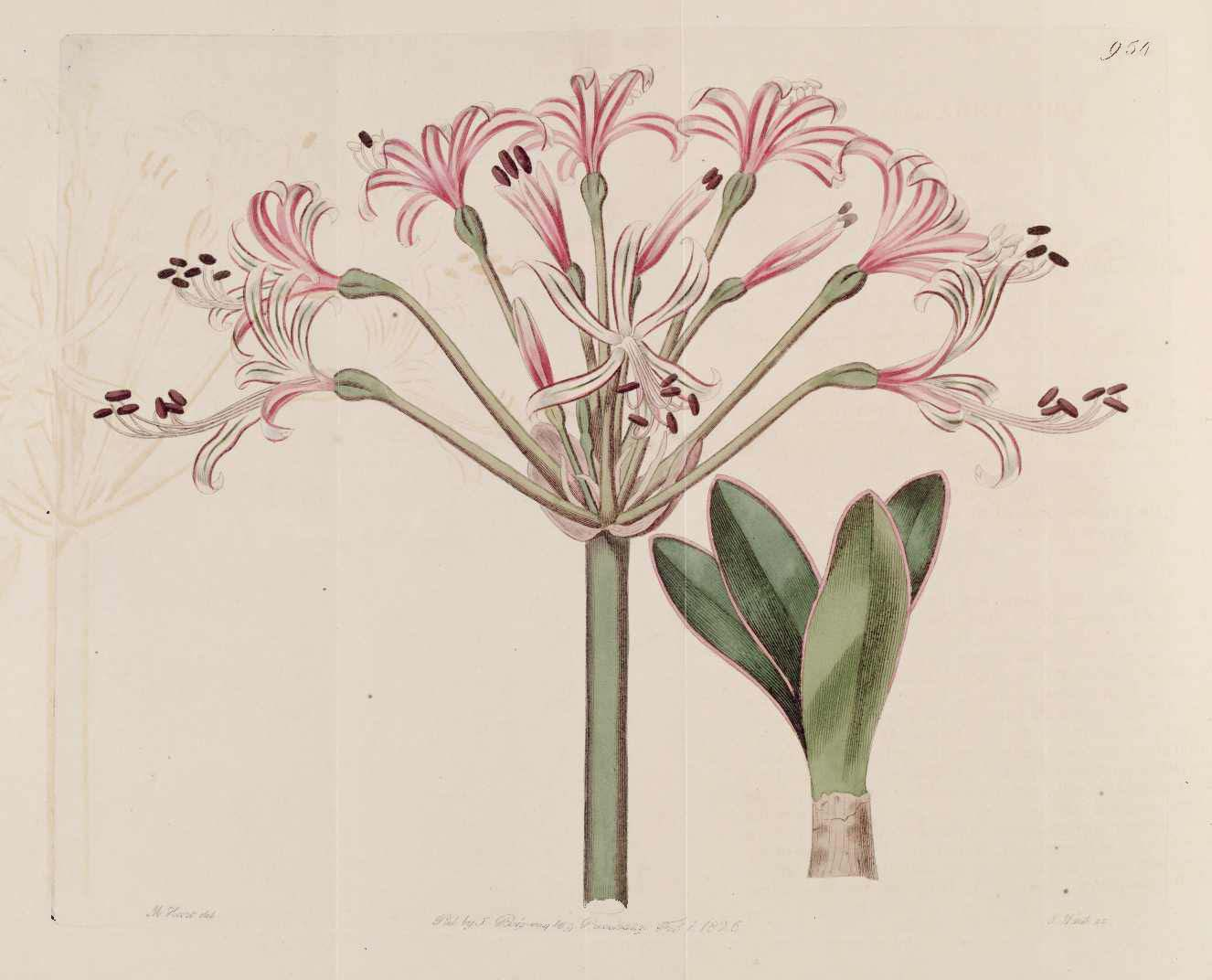

Scientific classification
- Kingdom: Plantae
- Clade: Tracheophytes
- Clade: Angiosperms
- Clade: Monocots
- Order: Asparagales
- Family: Amaryllidaceae
- Subfamily: Amaryllidoideae
- Genus: Brunsvigia
- Species: B. nervosa

Binomial name
- Brunsvigia nervosa (Poir.) ined.

Synonyms
- Amaryllis minor (Lindl.) D.Dietr.; Amaryllis nervosa Poir.; Amaryllis striata Jacq.; Brunsvigia humilis Eckl. ex Baker; Brunsvigia minor Lindl.; Brunsvigia striata W.T.Aiton; Brunsvigia striata var. rosea Herb.; Loxanthes striata (W.T.Aiton) Salisb.

= Brunsvigia nervosa =

Species of flowering plant

Brunsvigia nervosa is a geophyte belonging to the Amaryllidaceae family. The species is endemic to the Eastern and Western Capes of South Africa.
