= Brunsvigia kirkii =

Scientific classification
- Kingdom: Plantae
- Clade: Tracheophytes
- Clade: Angiosperms
- Clade: Monocots
- Order: Asparagales
- Family: Amaryllidaceae
- Subfamily: Amaryllidoideae
- Genus: Brunsvigia
- Species: B. kirkii

Binomial name
- Brunsvigia kirkii Baker

Species of flowering plant

Brunsvigia kirkii is a geophyte belonging to the Amaryllidaceae family. The species is native to Malawi and Tanzania.
