= Bundu Farm site =

Archeological site in South Africa

The Bundu Farm site (/ˈbʊnduː/) is a kidney shape depression (or pan) of land located in the Bushmanland region of Northern Cape, South Africa. The excavations at this site during 1998-2003 had unearthed a sequence of archaeological remains including Earlier, Middle and Later Stone Age assemblages and preserved fauna. These discoveries give an insight into the occupation of the Bushmanland prehistoric people and possible connection of cultures and traditions between the central interior and the West coast of South Africa.

== Name ==
The name Bundu is a Southern African slang meaning a distant or wilderness region. Its origin is possibly from the Shona word bundo which means ‘grasslands’.

== Features ==
Bundu Farm site is located on the eastern edge of Bushmanland. Located inside the Nama Karoo biome at an elevation of 1105 m in an open landscape, the site environment is semi-arid to arid with frequent prolonged droughts. Rainfall, which is highly seasonal, peaks between December and March.

Much of the indigenous fauna and flora have been depleted due to extensive farming. There are small populations of steenbok, rabbits, hares, aardvarks, porcupines and jackals along with dwarf bushes, grasses and seasonal flowering annuals. The ground is covered with thin, weakly developed, lime-rich sandy gravel soils above Dwyka and Ecca sandstones, silts and shales of the Karoo Supergroup. Rock components at the site are mostly quartzites and extends to banded ironstone, jasper and chert towards the Doringberge and the Orange River valley.

The biggest pan at the site is broadly kidney-shaped in plan, 250 m long by 150 m wide. It has shallow, steeply slope edges to the north and east and a more gently sloping along southern boundary. Maximum total depth based on sediments exposed after excavation is around 1.9 m. Stratigraphy and analysis of animal bones are based on deeper pits along the southern edge.

Seven main sedimentary horizons are recorded including red sand horizon, sand-silt horizon, pebble-rubble and calcified sediment horizon, heavily calcreted horizon, a mix of more sand and less calcretization horizon, white-grey calcified clay with cobble rubble horizon, and white powdery calcreted horizon.

== Dating ==
Earlier samples of animal teeth collected by Peter Beaumont of the McGregor Museum in 1990 yielded a date range of 144,054- 371,090 BP (before 1950). Based on the 1998- 2003 excavated fauna, these samples are likely to have been taken from the heavily calcreted or the sand-calcreted horizons (around 300 mm in depth). Other samples of fauna excavated in 1998- 2003 are dated around 200 000—300 000 BP. Together, the presence faunal remains in a stratified context is important to African studies of Middle Pleistocene because not many cases are recorded in history.

Analysis of bones, teeth and tusks suggested that the Pleistocene assemblages are dominated by both extant and extinct herbivores, such as the giant cape horse (Equus capensis), warthog (Phacochoerus sp.), springbok (Antidorcas marsupialis or Antidorcas bondi), wildebeest (Connochaetes gnou), and the giant hartebeest (Megalotragus priscus). They are bigger and heavier than modern specimens, which suggests cooler temperature in Pleistocene. These species also prefer standing water with high content of minerals and are more resistant to heat. They are slow grazers that prefer open grassland. Deposits of the gastropod, Tomichia ventricosa, at Swartkolkkloer, a large pan site 100 km to the west of Bundu, have been used in support of the argument that when standing water was present in the past, it was predominantly brackish. These mix of species at Bundu are also found at Florisbad and provides the first evidence for the extension of the Florisian Faunal Suite into the Bushmanland region during the Pleistocene.

== Prehistoric occupation ==
The presence of herbivores also poses as an attraction for Stone Age scavengers and hunters. Analysis of stone tools are divided into three groups: cores and core tools, flakes and chunks. Two assemblage groups are recognized; a Final Acheulean or transitional ESA/MSA assemblage within and beneath calcrete and an MSA assemblage above the calcrete.

Excavation in 2002 revealed a roughly oval area 300 mm in diameter and up to 30 mm thick. The sediment within was calcined and exhibited a reddish color mottled with black flecks, suggesting possible heating of the surrounding soil. This couples with the remain of in situ burnt animal bones raises the possibility of it being hearth.

Sediments and assemblages at the site provide evidence of environmental and ecological conditions at the site that differ significantly from modern conditions. The present farmland used to be an open grassland with increased or more regular rainfall associated with cooler temperatures. During this time hominids visiting the site were basing their technology around radial irregular and large Levallois cores and the production of flakes and large flake-blades, core tools and occasional bifaces. This combination of cores and flakes suggests a similar oscillating of ESA and MSA technologies to that reported for Haaskral pan in the eastern Nama-Karoo.
