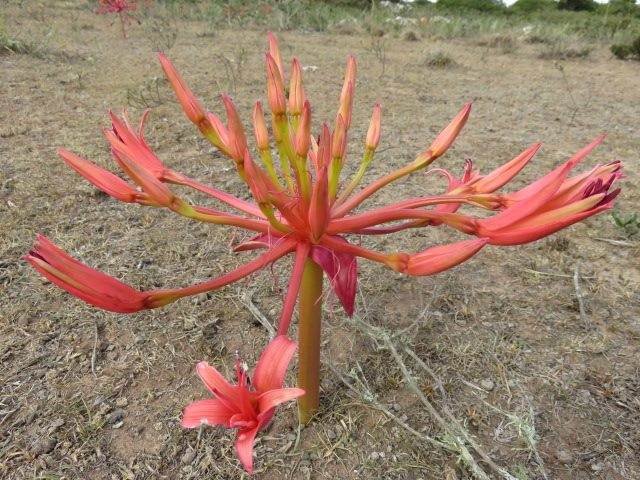
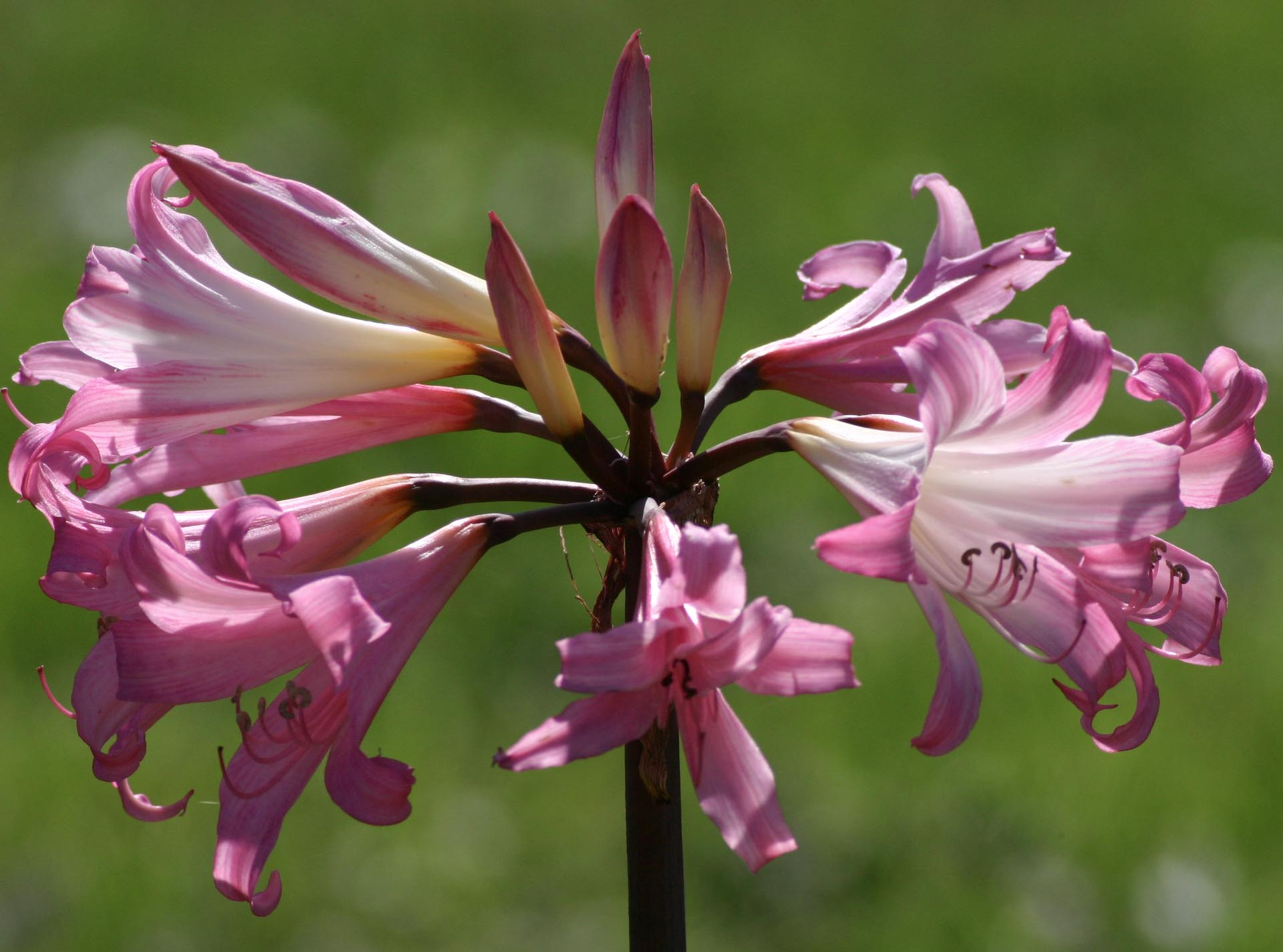
- Parent genera of the artificial hybrid × Amarygia Cif. & Giacom. Brunsvigia Heist. and Amaryllis L.

Scientific classification
- Kingdom: Plantae
- Clade: Tracheophytes
- Clade: Angiosperms
- Clade: Monocots
- Order: Asparagales
- Family: Amaryllidaceae
- Genus: × Amarygia; Cif. & Giacom.

Species
- See here

Synonyms
- × Brunsdonna Tubergen ex Worsley

= × Amarygia =

Hybrid genus of flowering plants

× Amarygia is an artificial hybrid genus of the genera Amaryllis and Brunsvigia.

== Description ==
The flowers usually show a closer resemblance to Amaryllis than to Brunsvigia.

== History ==
According to botanist Max Bourke the species was first crossbred by John Bidwell, that was undescribed. Bourke proposes the name for the species as "× Amarygia," and the subspecies "× Amarygia parkeri" with Amarygia standing for ameliae.

== Characteristics ==
The species is unable to reproduce with Atropa bella-donna or closely related pollen strains. The flowers have a pitcher like appearance and tilt downward. Seeds in the species start out yellow and then progressively become red over time before hatching.

== Taxonomy ==
It was published by Raffaele Ciferri and Valerio Giacomini in 1950.

=== Species ===
It has two species:

- × Amarygia bidwillii (Worsley) H.E.Moore (a hybrid of Amaryllis belladonna and Brunsvigia orientalis)
- × Amarygia parkeri (W.Watson) H.E.Moore (a hybrid of Amaryllis belladonna and Brunsvigia josephiniae)
