= Brunsvigia marginata =

Scientific classification
- Kingdom: Plantae
- Clade: Tracheophytes
- Clade: Angiosperms
- Clade: Monocots
- Order: Asparagales
- Family: Amaryllidaceae
- Subfamily: Amaryllidoideae
- Genus: Brunsvigia
- Species: B. marginata

Binomial name
- Brunsvigia marginata (Jacq.) W.T.Aiton

Synonyms
- Amaryllis marginata Jacq.; Elisena marginata (Jacq.) M.Roem.; Imhofia marginata (Jacq.) Herb.; Loxanthes marginata (Jacq.) Salisb.; Nerine marginata (Jacq.) Herb.

Species of flowering plant

Brunsvigia marginata, often called the red candelabra lily or firelily candelabra, is a geophyte belonging to the Amaryllidaceae family. The species is endemic to the Western Cape.
