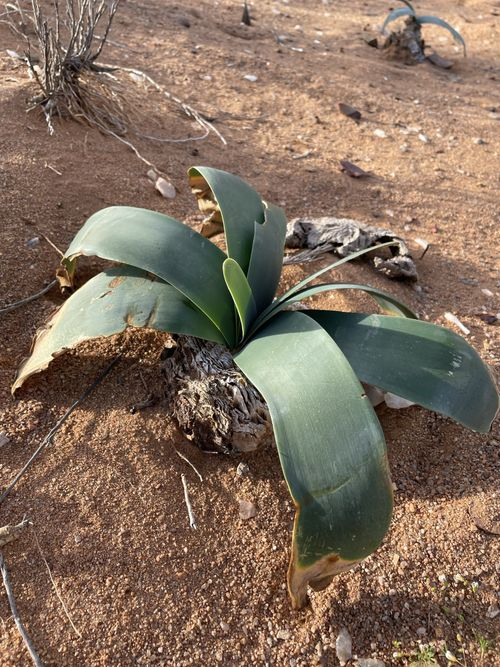
- Brunsvigia herrei, observed in South Africa by Matt Berger

Scientific classification
- Kingdom: Plantae
- Clade: Tracheophytes
- Clade: Angiosperms
- Clade: Monocots
- Order: Asparagales
- Family: Amaryllidaceae
- Subfamily: Amaryllidoideae
- Genus: Brunsvigia
- Species: B. herrei

Binomial name
- Brunsvigia herrei Leight. ex W.F.Barker

= Brunsvigia herrei =

Species of flowering plant

Brunsvigia herrei, commonly known as Herre's candelabra, is a geophyte belonging to the Amaryllidaceae family. The species is native to Namibia and the Northern Cape. It occurs from southern Namibia to Springbok. It has a range of 4 998 km^{2} and there are about ten subpopulations in South Africa and a few more in Namibia. The plant is threatened by overgrazing by livestock.
