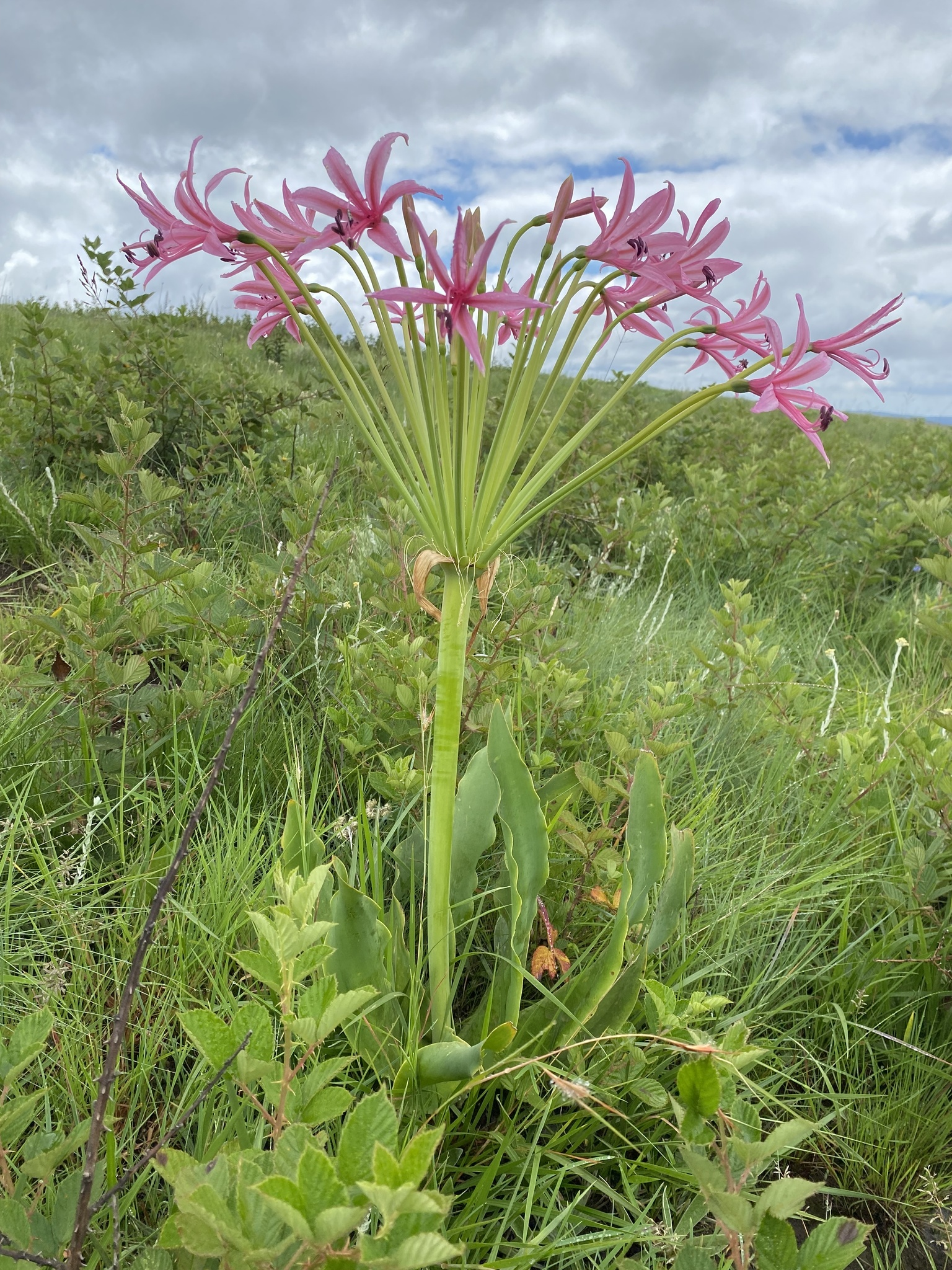

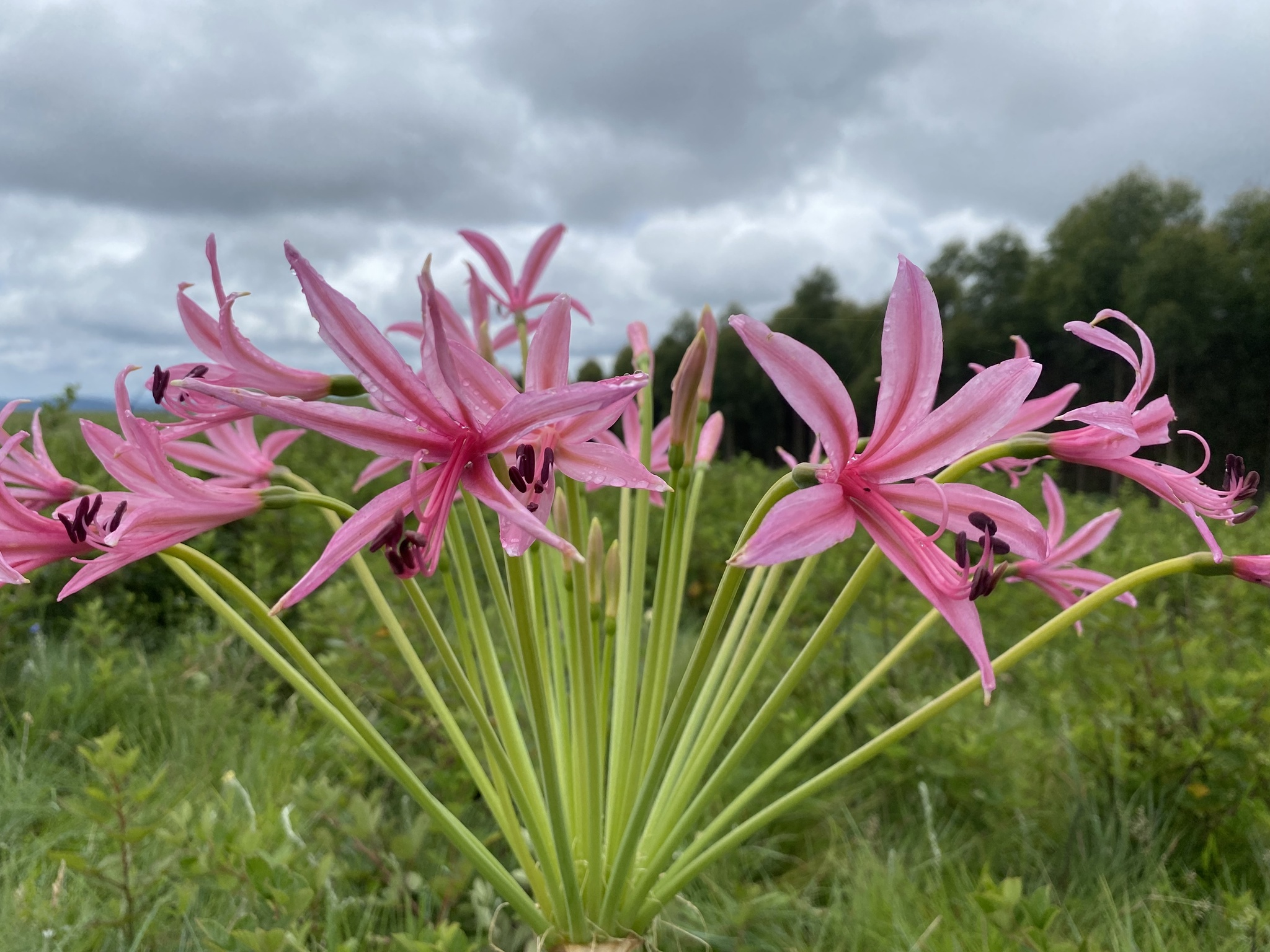

Scientific classification
- Kingdom: Plantae
- Clade: Tracheophytes
- Clade: Angiosperms
- Clade: Monocots
- Order: Asparagales
- Family: Amaryllidaceae
- Subfamily: Amaryllidoideae
- Genus: Brunsvigia
- Species: B. grandiflora

Binomial name
- Brunsvigia grandiflora Lindl.

Synonyms
- Amaryllis banksiana Lindl.; Amaryllis grandiflora (Lindl.) Herb.; Amaryllis grandiflora var. banksiana Herb.; Amaryllis slateriana Lindl.; Ammocharis slateriana (Lindl.) Kunth; Brunsvigia banksiana (Lindl.) T.Durand & Schinz; Brunsvigia slateriana (Lindl.) Benth. & Hook.f. ex Tavel; Brunsvigia sphaerocarpa Baker

= Brunsvigia grandiflora =

Species of flowering plant

Brunsvigia grandiflora, commonly known as the giant candelabra flower, is a geophyte belonging to the Amaryllidaceae family. The species is endemic to KwaZulu-Natal, Mpumalanga, Eastern Cape and the Free State.
