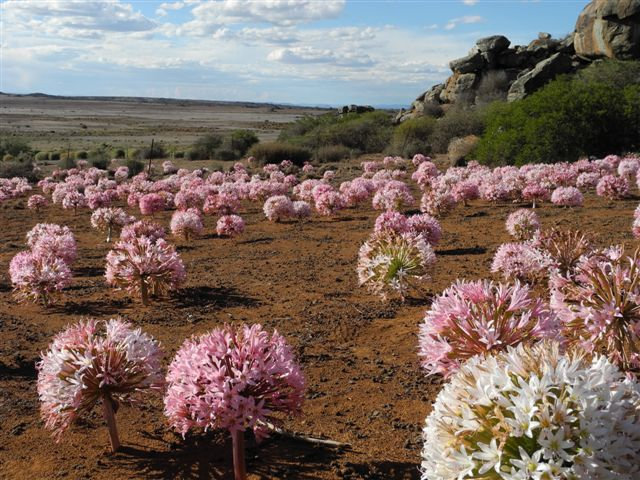
- Brunsvigia bosmaniae near Nieuwoudtville
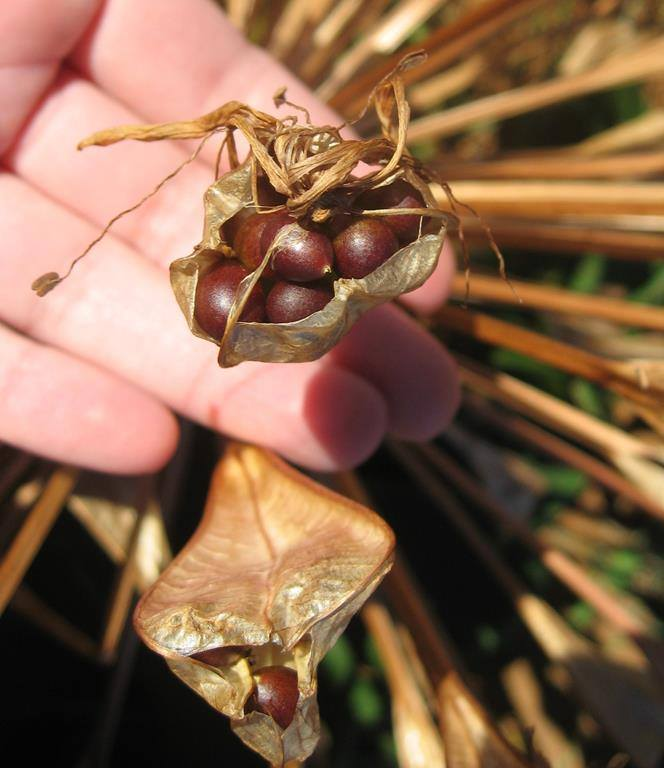

Scientific classification
- Kingdom: Plantae
- Clade: Tracheophytes
- Clade: Angiosperms
- Clade: Monocots
- Order: Asparagales
- Family: Amaryllidaceae
- Subfamily: Amaryllidoideae
- Genus: Brunsvigia
- Species: B. bosmaniae

Binomial name
- Brunsvigia bosmaniae F.M.Leight.

= Brunsvigia bosmaniae =

Species of flowering plant

Brunsvigia bosmaniae is a South African geophyte tumbleweed plant belonging to the family Amaryllidaceae, and occurring along the dry west coast of the Cape Province. It is known for its profuse pink flowers, which usually occur in March, a few weeks after late summer rains.

Preferring the winter rainfall region of southern Africa, it is found on open flats, coastal sand, rocky outcrops, loam, granite and clay soils, in Namaqualand, Western Karoo, the Bokkeveld Plateau, and the area around the Roggeveld Mountains.

The species produces 5 to 8 deciduous leaves that are dark green with a reddish edge, smooth, broad, tongue-shaped, hugging the ground when mature, and developing after flowering. It has a globose bulb with a tunic typically brittle and coppery-brown. In common with other Brunsvigia species, plants will not flower if repeatedly disturbed by replanting. The flowers are especially fragrant at night, during which period they are pollinated by sphingid and noctuid moths. In common with other members of the family, this species forms large spherical fruiting heads which detach from the plant at maturity and efficiently disperse seeds while being bowled along by the wind (see tumbleweed).

Infusions of the bulbs have been used for medicinal and hallucinogenic purposes. Brunsvigia species are rich in alkaloids, particularly brunsvigine or 5,11b-methanomorphanthridine, and may be extremely toxic.

B. bosmaniae was first described in 1932 by the South African botanist Frances Margaret Leighton (1909–2006) in the journal South African Gardening, and the specific epithet honours Marie Bosman, who collected the plant for Leighton.
