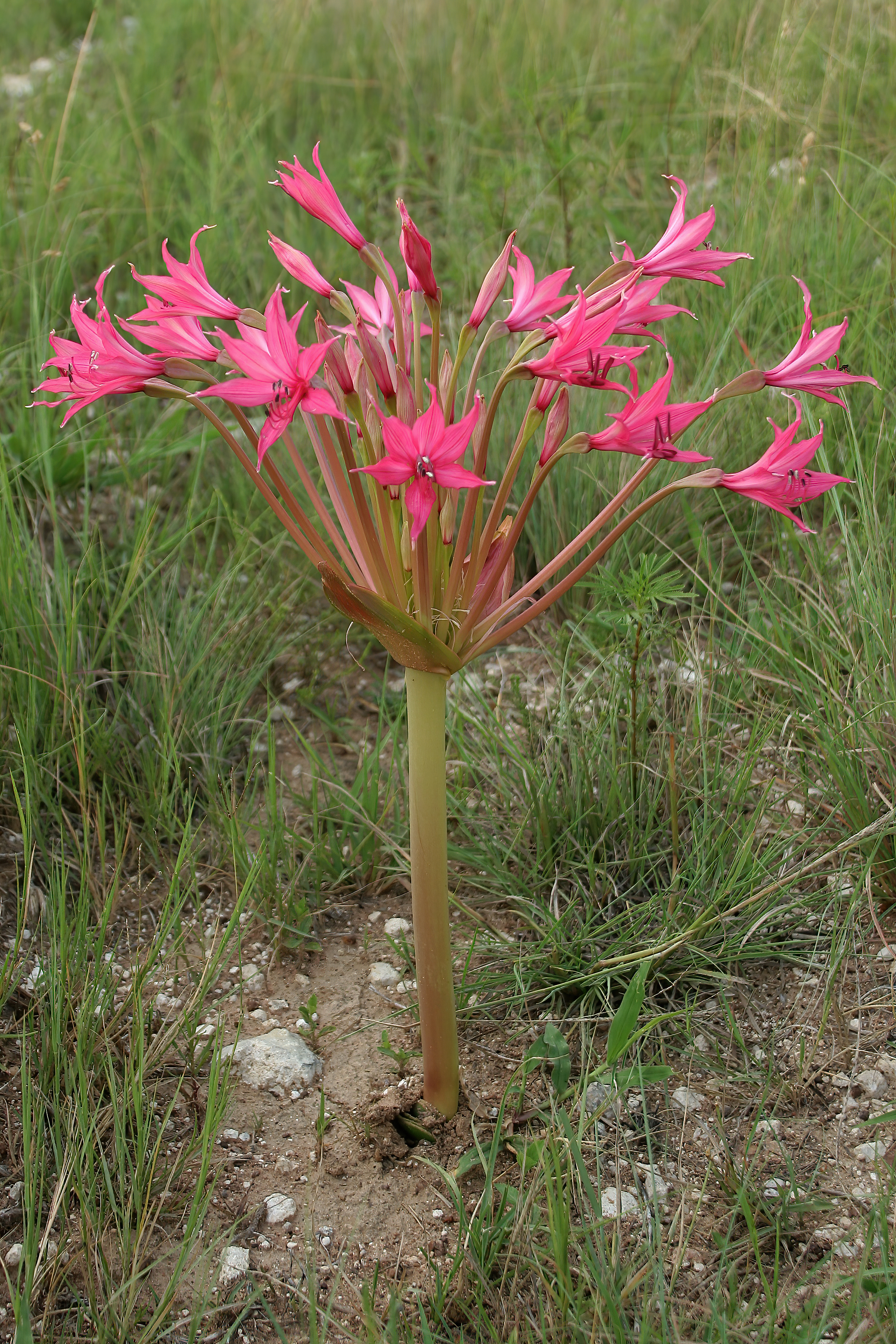

Scientific classification
- Kingdom: Plantae
- Clade: Tracheophytes
- Clade: Angiosperms
- Clade: Monocots
- Order: Asparagales
- Family: Amaryllidaceae
- Subfamily: Amaryllidoideae
- Genus: Brunsvigia
- Species: B. radulosa

Binomial name
- Brunsvigia radulosa Herb.

Synonyms
- Brunsvigia burchelliana Herb.; Brunsvigia cooperi Baker

= Brunsvigia radulosa =

Species of flowering plant

Brunsvigia radulosa, commonly known as the candelabra flower, is a geophyte belonging to the Amaryllidaceae family. The species is native to Botswana, Eswatini, Lesotho and South Africa.
