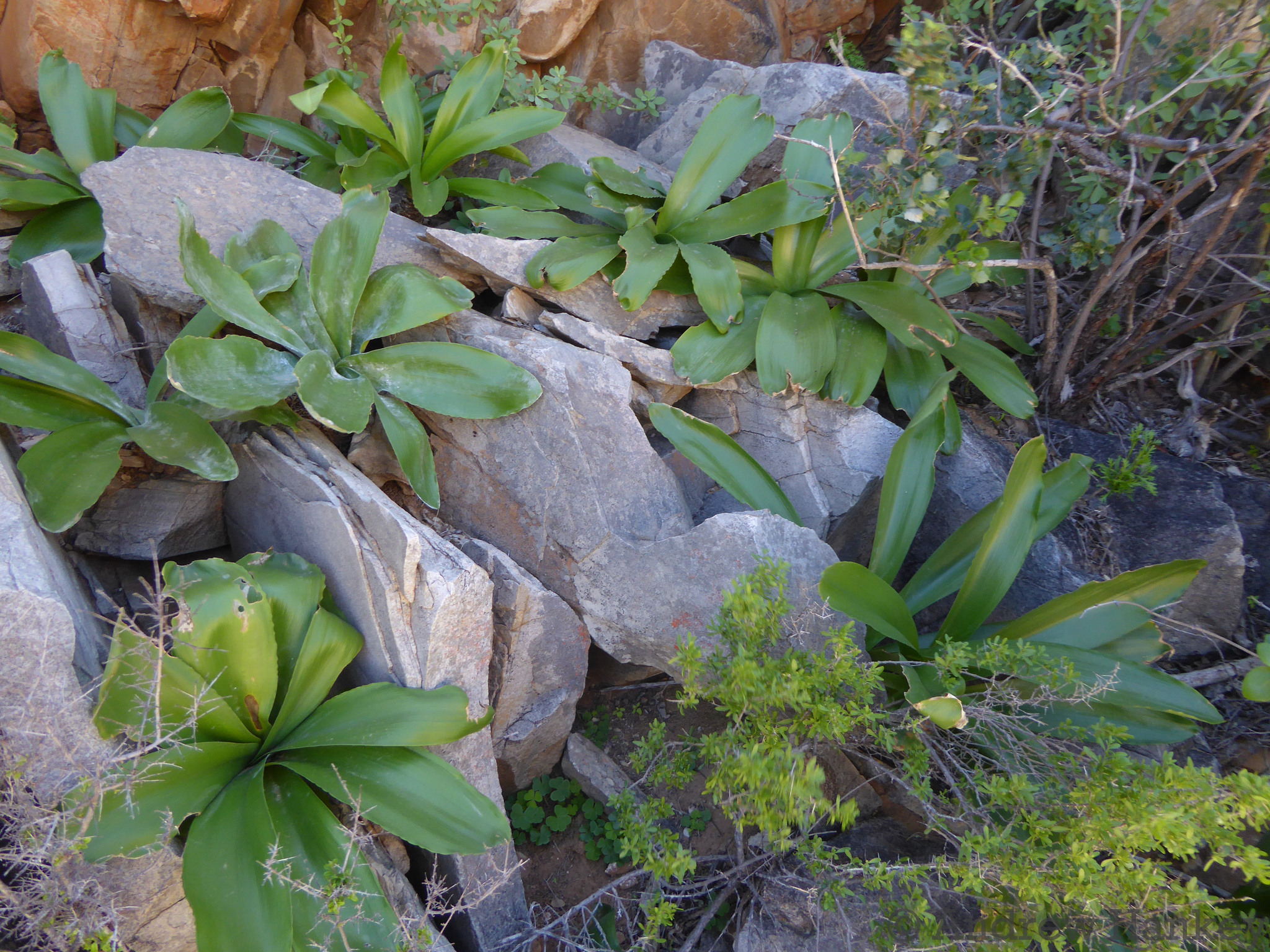

Conservation status
- Vulnerable (IUCN 3.1)

Scientific classification
- Kingdom: Plantae
- Clade: Tracheophytes
- Clade: Angiosperms
- Clade: Monocots
- Order: Asparagales
- Family: Amaryllidaceae
- Subfamily: Amaryllidoideae
- Genus: Amaryllis
- Species: A. paradisicola

Binomial name
- Amaryllis paradisicola Snijman

= Amaryllis paradisicola =

Species of flowering plant

Amaryllis paradisicola is a species of bulbous perennial plant from South Africa.

== Classification ==
Amaryllis paradisicola was described by Dierdré A. Snijman in 1998 in a paper in the journal Bothalia. It is one of only two species in the genus Amaryllis, the other being Amaryllis belladonna, from further south in South Africa.

== Description ==
Amaryllis paradisicola flowers in April, producing a group of 10–21 Narcissus-scented flowers, arranged in a ring. They begin purple–pink in colour, and become darker over time. It has broader leaves than A. belladonna, longer stamens and a more deeply divided trifid stigma.

== Distribution ==
Amaryllis paradisicola is known from two populations comprising fewer than 2000 individuals. They grow on shady quartzite cliffs in the Richtersveld National Park, near the town of Vioolsdrif, Northern Cape. This is a much drier and cooler environment than that enjoyed by A. belladonna in the Western Cape. Although it occurs only in a protected area, A. paradisicola is considered a vulnerable species on the Red List of South African Plants, because of the potential effects of damage by baboons.
