= Brunsvigia gregaria =

Scientific classification
- Kingdom: Plantae
- Clade: Tracheophytes
- Clade: Angiosperms
- Clade: Monocots
- Order: Asparagales
- Family: Amaryllidaceae
- Subfamily: Amaryllidoideae
- Genus: Brunsvigia
- Species: B. gregaria

Binomial name
- Brunsvigia gregaria R.A.Dyer

Species of flowering plant

Brunsvigia gregaria, commonly known as the Albany candelabra or gregarious candelabra, is a geophyte belonging to the Amaryllidaceae family. The species is endemic to the Eastern Cape.
