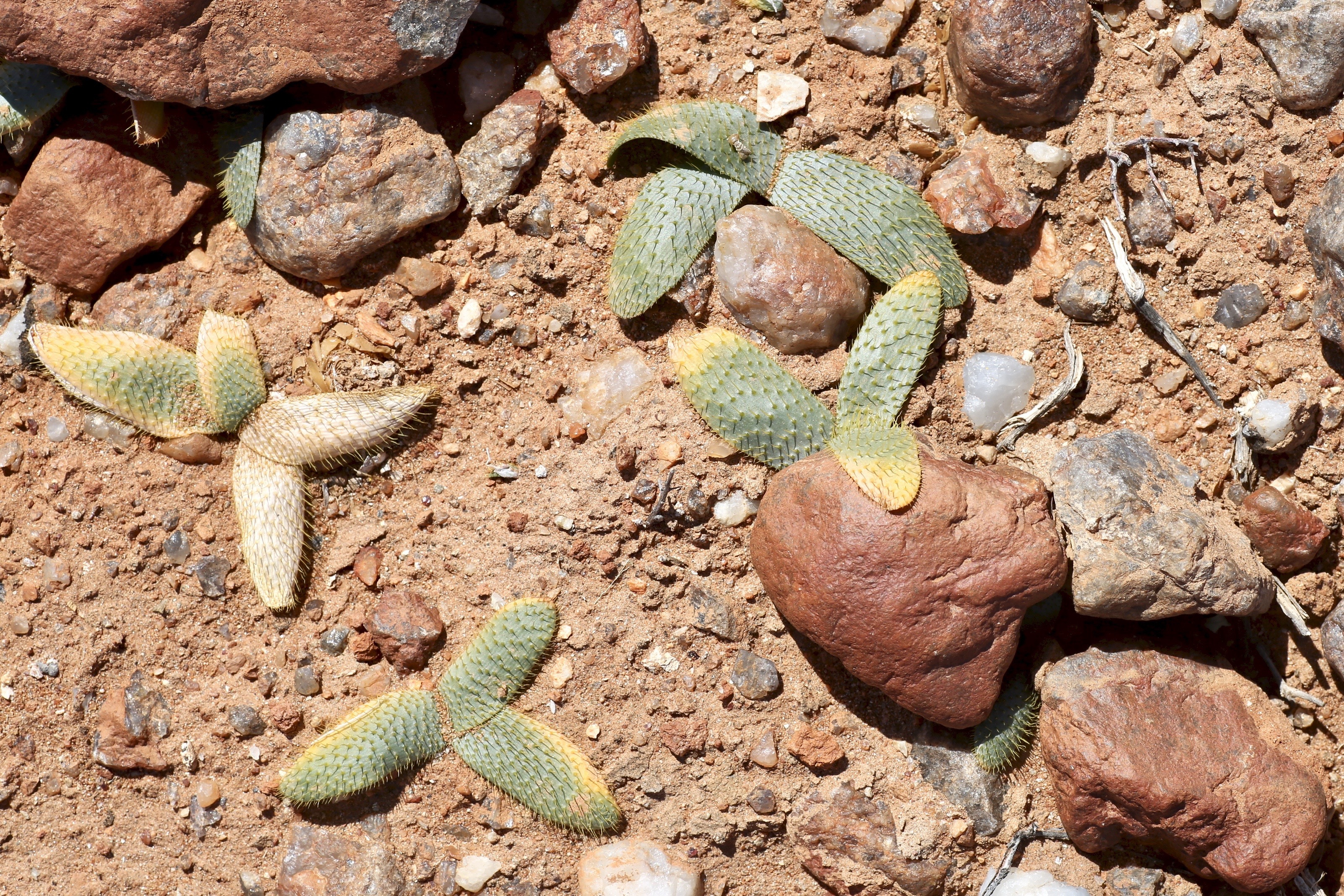

Scientific classification
- Kingdom: Plantae
- Clade: Tracheophytes
- Clade: Angiosperms
- Clade: Monocots
- Order: Asparagales
- Family: Amaryllidaceae
- Subfamily: Amaryllidoideae
- Genus: Brunsvigia
- Species: B. namaquana

Binomial name
- Brunsvigia namaquana D.Müll.-Doblies & U.Müll.-Doblies

= Brunsvigia namaquana =

Species of flowering plant

Brunsvigia namaquana is a geophyte belonging to the Amaryllidaceae family. The species is endemic to the Northern Cape. It has a range of 25 429 km^{2} and occurs from Steinkopf and Aggeneys to Wallekraal and Loeriesfontein. It is part of the Succulent Karoo vegetation.
