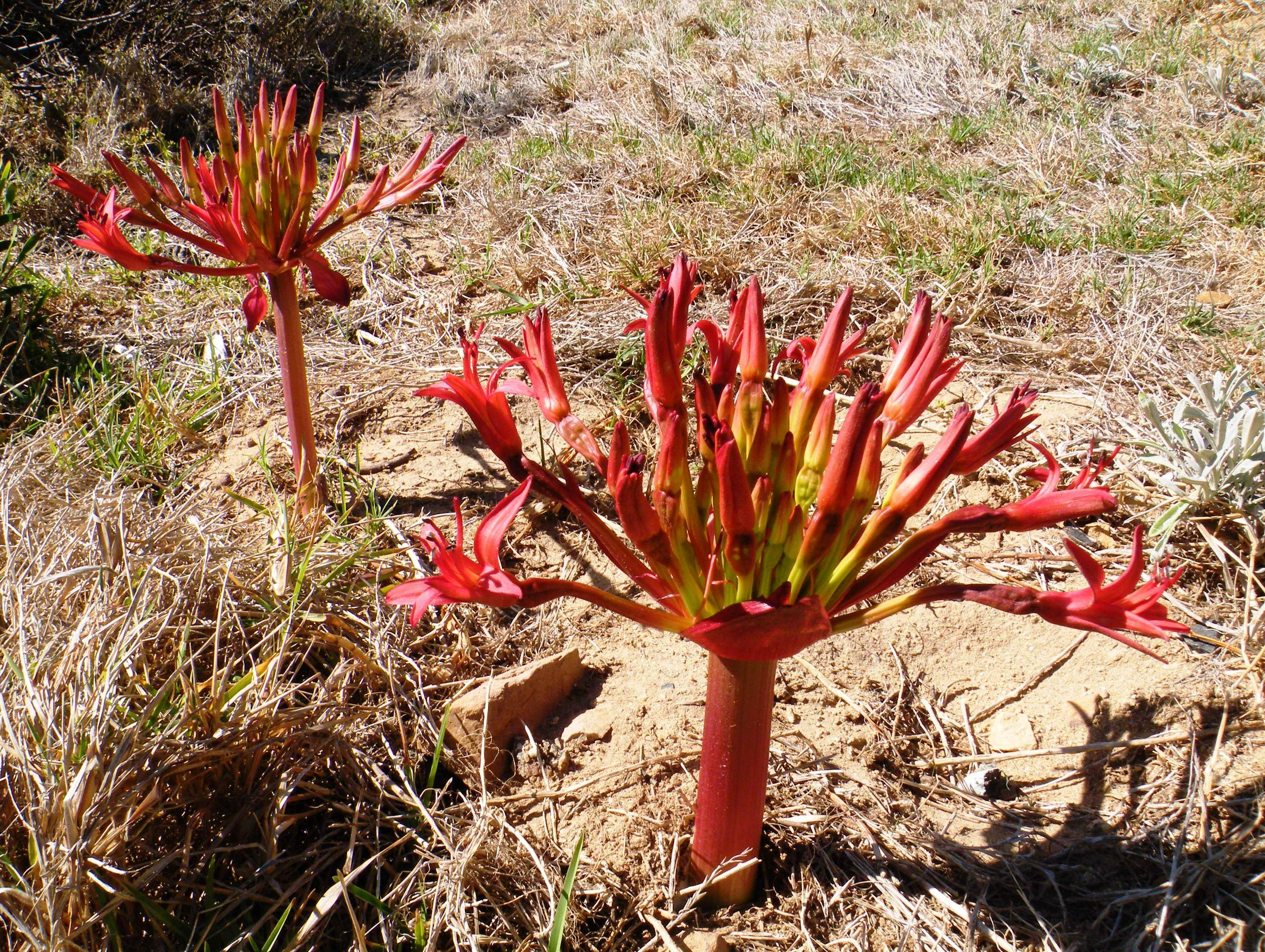

Scientific classification
- Kingdom: Plantae
- Clade: Tracheophytes
- Clade: Angiosperms
- Clade: Monocots
- Order: Asparagales
- Family: Amaryllidaceae
- Subfamily: Amaryllidoideae
- Genus: Brunsvigia
- Species: B. orientalis

Binomial name
- Brunsvigia orientalis (L.) Aiton ex Eckl.

Synonyms
- Amaryllis multiflora D.Dietr.; Amaryllis nobilis Salisb.; Amaryllis orientalis L.; Brunsvigia gigantea Heist.; Brunsvigia multiflora W.T.Aiton; Brunsvigia multiflora var. rubricaulis Herb.; Brunsvigia rubricaulis M.Roem.; Coburgia multiflora (W.T.Aiton) Herb.; Crinum candelabrum M.Roem.; Haemanthus orientalis (L.) Thunb.

= Brunsvigia orientalis =

Species of flowering plant

Brunsvigia orientalis, commonly known as the candelabra flower, red candelabra flower, king candelabra, chandelier lily, chandelier plant and sore-eye flower, is a geophyte belonging to the Amaryllidaceae family. The species is endemic to the Western Cape.
