= Brunsvigia litoralis =

Scientific classification
- Kingdom: Plantae
- Clade: Tracheophytes
- Clade: Angiosperms
- Clade: Monocots
- Order: Asparagales
- Family: Amaryllidaceae
- Subfamily: Amaryllidoideae
- Genus: Brunsvigia
- Species: B. litoralis

Binomial name
- Brunsvigia litoralis R.A.Dyer

Species of flowering plant

Brunsvigia litoralis, commonly known as the surfer's candelabra, is a geophyte belonging to the Amaryllidaceae family. The species is endemic to the Eastern Cape and the Western Cape, occurring from the Great Brak River to Gqeberha. The plant grows on the narrow coastal plains and has an area of occurrence of less than 250 km^{2}. The population is declining due to continued development on the coast.
