= Brunsvigia undulata =

Scientific classification
- Kingdom: Plantae
- Clade: Tracheophytes
- Clade: Angiosperms
- Clade: Monocots
- Order: Asparagales
- Family: Amaryllidaceae
- Subfamily: Amaryllidoideae
- Genus: Brunsvigia
- Species: B. undulata

Binomial name
- Brunsvigia undulata F.M.Leight.

Species of flowering plant

Brunsvigia undulata, commonly known as the ruby candelabra flower or ruby brunsvigia, is a geophyte belonging to the Amaryllidaceae family. The species is endemic to KwaZulu-Natal and occurs on the Mahwaqa Mountain and south of Estcourt, South Africa. The plant is considered rare.
