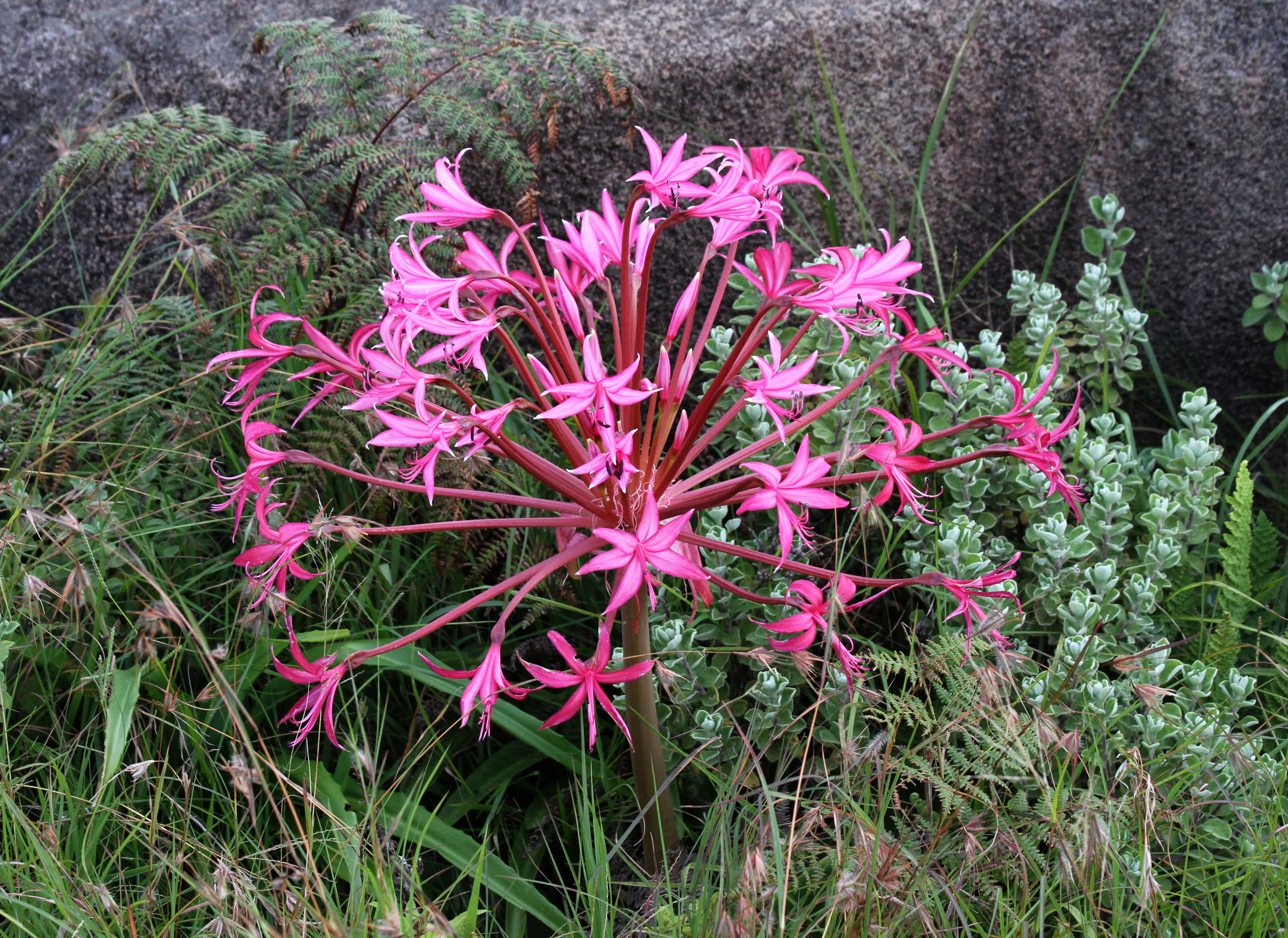

Scientific classification
- Kingdom: Plantae
- Clade: Tracheophytes
- Clade: Angiosperms
- Clade: Monocots
- Order: Asparagales
- Family: Amaryllidaceae
- Subfamily: Amaryllidoideae
- Genus: Brunsvigia
- Species: B. natalensis

Binomial name
- Brunsvigia natalensis Baker

= Brunsvigia natalensis =

Species of flowering plant

Brunsvigia natalensis, commonly known as the Natal candelabra flower or umbhola, is a geophyte belonging to the Amaryllidaceae family. The species is endemic to Gauteng, KwaZulu-Natal, Limpopo, Mpumalanga, Free State as well as Eswatini and Lesotho.
