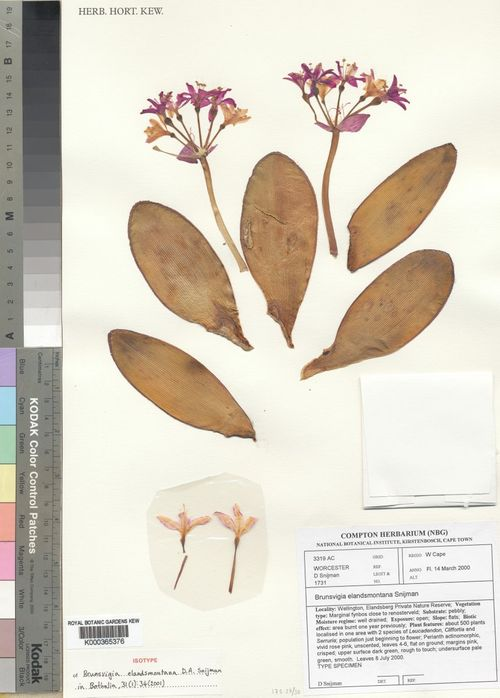
- Brunsvigia elandsmontana, collected in South Africa by Royal Botanic Gardens, Kew

Scientific classification
- Kingdom: Plantae
- Clade: Tracheophytes
- Clade: Angiosperms
- Clade: Monocots
- Order: Asparagales
- Family: Amaryllidaceae
- Subfamily: Amaryllidoideae
- Genus: Brunsvigia
- Species: B. elandsmontana

Binomial name
- Brunsvigia elandsmontana Snijman

= Brunsvigia elandsmontana =

Species of flowering plant

Brunsvigia elandsmontana, commonly known as the Elandsberg candelabra lily, is a geophyte belonging to the Amaryllidaceae family. The species is endemic to the Western Cape. It occurs at Elandsberg and is part of the fynbos and renosterveld. The plant has lost much of its habitat to grain cultivation over the past 70 years. There is only one population consisting of less than 700 plants and it is currently threatened by overgrazing by wildlife.
