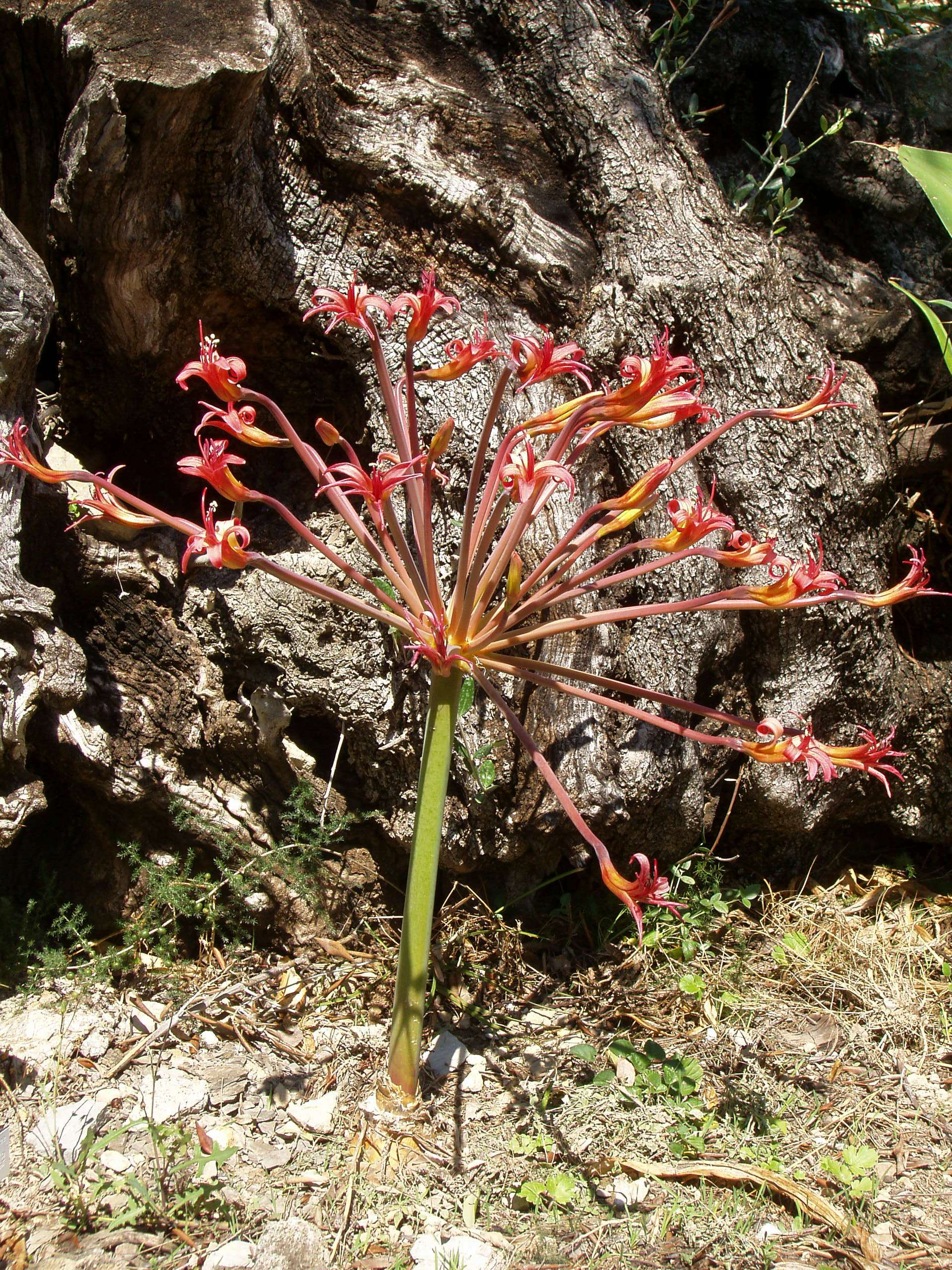

Scientific classification
- Kingdom: Plantae
- Clade: Tracheophytes
- Clade: Angiosperms
- Clade: Monocots
- Order: Asparagales
- Family: Amaryllidaceae
- Subfamily: Amaryllidoideae
- Genus: Brunsvigia
- Species: B. josephinae

Binomial name
- Brunsvigia josephinae Ker-Gawl.

= Brunsvigia josephinae =

Species of flowering plant

Brunsvigia josephinae, commonly called Josephine's lily or candelabra lily, is a deciduous, subtropical species of Brunsvigia originating from South Africa. It is marked by deep pink to red flowerheads which are about 12 to 15 inches long. It flourishes in medium humidity, at temperatures between 50 and 75 °F (10 to 24 °C). Flowering stems appear from the bulbs in March and April, and the leaves develop later. These bulbs can take 12 years to settle before they flower, but they flower annually once established. It is available from commercial sources.

B. josephinae is about 0.65 m tall when flowering. Its bulbs are some 200 mm in diameter and usually exposed. Leaves appear only in winter; they are blueish grey and typically range from 8-20 leaves per plant. Dark red, tubular flowers appear in late summer to autumn; they are 15 mm long atop stalks approximately 650 mm long, with 30-40 flowers per plant. Plants may take as long as 14 years to mature from seeds.

The lily was named for Joséphine de Beauharnais, Napoleon's empress.
