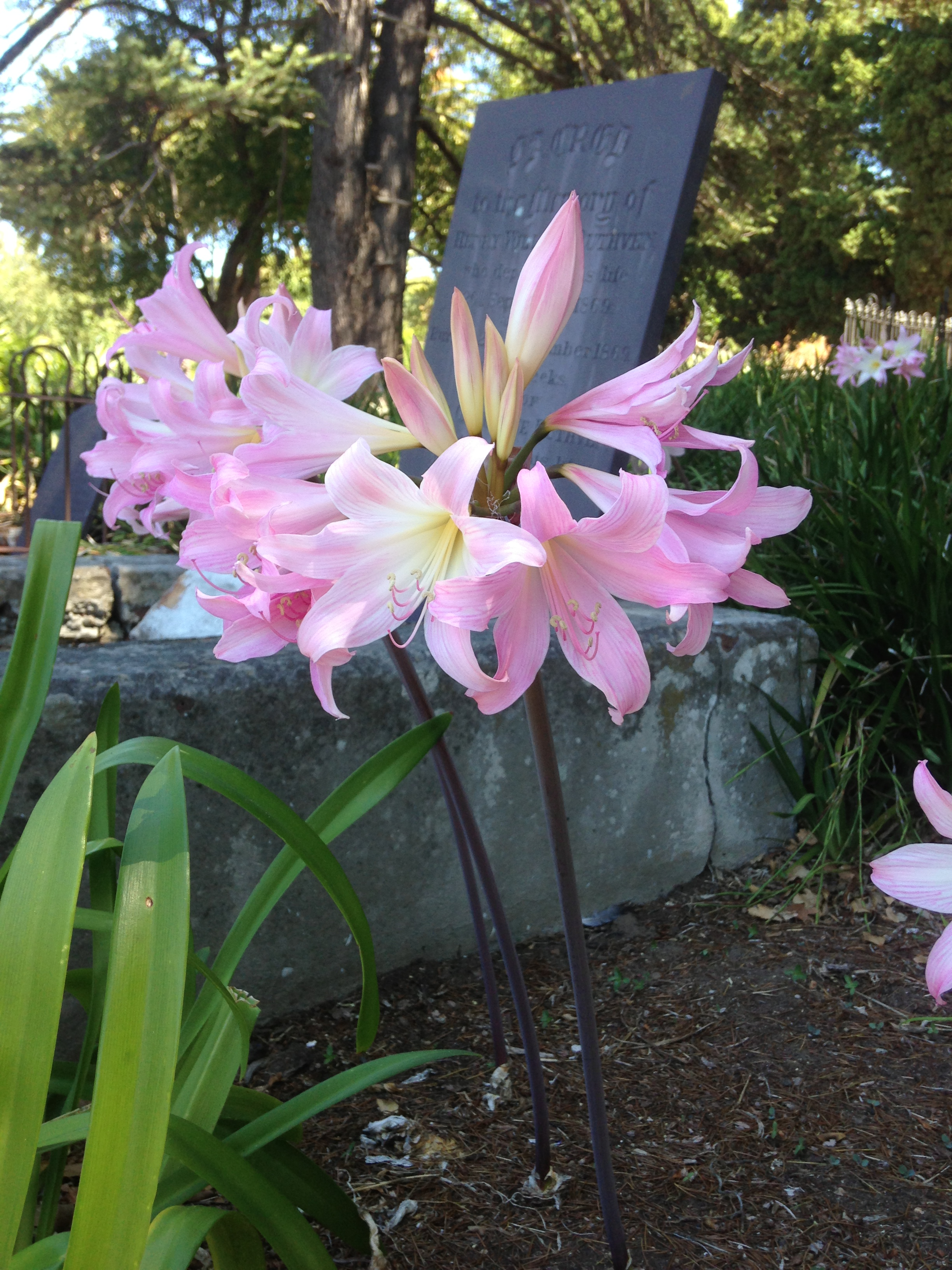
- Amaryllis belladonna

Scientific classification
- Kingdom: Plantae
- Clade: Tracheophytes
- Clade: Angiosperms
- Clade: Monocots
- Order: Asparagales
- Family: Amaryllidaceae
- Subfamily: Amaryllidoideae
- Tribe: Amaryllideae
- Genus: Amaryllis; L.

Type species
- Amaryllis belladonna L.

Species
- See text.

= Amaryllis =

Genus of plants

Amaryllis (/ˌæməˈrɪlɪs/) is the only genus in the subtribe Amaryllidinae (tribe Amaryllideae). It is a small genus of flowering bulbs, with two species. The better known of the two, Amaryllis belladonna, is a native of the Western Cape region of South Africa, particularly the rocky southwest area between the Olifants River Valley and Knysna.

For many years there was confusion among botanists over the generic names Amaryllis and Hippeastrum, one result of which is that the common name 'amaryllis' is mainly used for cultivars of the genus Hippeastrum, widely sold in the winter months for their ability to bloom indoors.

Plants of the genus Amaryllis are known as belladonna lily, Jersey lily, naked lady, amarillo, Easter lily in Southern Australia or, in South Africa, March lily due to its propensity to flower around March. This is one of numerous genera with the common name 'lily' due to their flower shape and growth habit. However, they are only distantly related to the true lily, Lilium. In the Victorian language of flowers, amaryllis means "love, beauty, and determination", and can also represent hope and achievement.

== Description ==
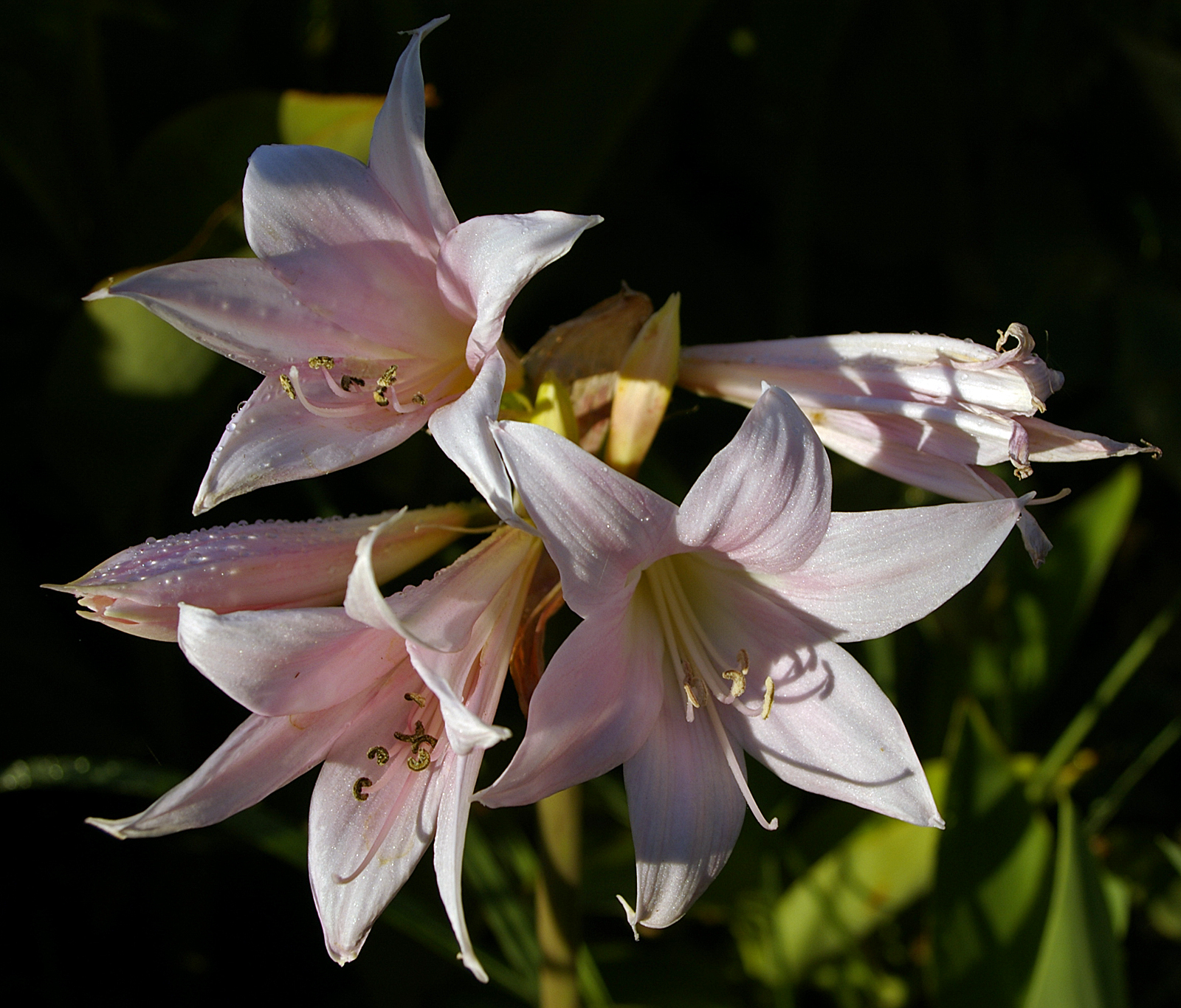
Amaryllis belladonna flowers

Amaryllis is a bulbous plant, with each bulb being 5–10 cm (2.0–3.9 in) in diameter. It has several strap-shaped, hysteranthous, green leaves with midrib, 30–50 cm (12–20 in) long and 2–3 cm (0.79–1.18 in) broad, arranged in two rows.

Each bulb produces one or two leafless, stout, persistent and erect stems 30–60 cm (12–24 in) tall, each of which bears at the top a cluster of two to twelve zygomorphic, funnel-shaped flowers without a tube. Each flower is 6–10 cm (2.4–3.9 in) in diameter with six spreading tepals (three outer sepals, three inner petals, with similar appearance to each other). The usual color is white with crimson veins, but pink or purple also occur naturally. Stamens are very shortly connate basally, declinate, unequal. Style is declinate, stigma is three-lobed. Ovules are approx. 8 per locule. Seeds are compressed-globose, white to pink. The number of chromosomes is 2n = 22.

== Taxonomy ==
The single genus is in subtribe Amaryllidinae, in the tribe Amaryllideae. The taxonomy of the genus has been controversial. In 1753 Carl Linnaeus created the name Amaryllis belladonna, the type species of the genus Amaryllis. At the time both South African and South American plants were placed in the same genus; subsequently they were separated into two different genera. The key question is whether Linnaeus's type was a South African plant or a South American plant. If the latter, Amaryllis would be the correct name for the genus Hippeastrum, and a different name would have to be used for the genus discussed here. Alan W. Meerow et al. have briefly summarized the debate, which took place from 1938 onwards and involved botanists on both sides of the Atlantic. The outcome was a decision by the 14th International Botanical Congress in 1987 that Amaryllis L. should be a conserved name (i.e. correct regardless of priority) and ultimately based on a specimen of the South African Amaryllis belladonna from the Clifford Herbarium at the Natural History Museum in London.

=== Species ===
As of October 2020, Amaryllis had only two accepted species, both native to the Cape Provinces of South Africa:

- Amaryllis belladonna L. – south-west Cape Provinces; introduced into many parts of the world, including California, Great Britain, Australia and New Zealand
- Amaryllis paradisicola Snijman – west Cape Provinces

=== Phylogeny ===
Amaryllidinae are placed within Amaryllideae as follow:

These are phylogenetically related as follows:

- Tribe Amaryllideae
  - Subtribe Amaryllidinae
  - - Subtribe Boophoninae
    - - Subtribe Strumariinae
      - Subtribe Crininae

=== Etymology ===
The name Amaryllis is taken from a shepherdess in Virgil's pastoral Eclogues, (from the Greek ἀμαρύσσω, amarysso, 'to sparkle').

Although the 1987 decision settled the question of the scientific name of the genus, the common name 'amaryllis' continues to be used differently. Bulbs sold as amaryllis and described as "ready to bloom for the holidays" belong to the allied genus Hippeastrum. The common name "naked lady" comes from the plant's pattern of flowering when the foliage has died down. This name is also used for other bulbs with a similar growth and flowering pattern; some of these have their own widely used and accepted common names, such as the resurrection lily (Lycoris squamigera).

== Habitat ==
In areas of its native habitat with mountainous fynbos, flowering tends to be suppressed until after bush fires as dense overhead vegetation prevents growth. In more open sandy areas of the Western Cape, the plant flowers annually. Plants tend to be very localized in dense concentrations due to the seeds' large size and heavy weight. Strong winds shake loose the seeds, which fall to ground and immediately start to germinate, aided by the first winter rains.

== Ecology ==
The leaves are produced in the autumn or early spring in warm climates depending on the onset of rain and eventually die down by late spring. The bulb is then dormant until late summer. The plant is not frost-tolerant, nor does it do well in tropical environments since they require a dry resting period between leaf growth and flower spike production.

One or two leafless stems arise from the bulb in the dry ground in late summer (March in its native habitat and August in USDA zone 7).

The plant has a symbiotic relationship with carpenter bees. It is also visited by noctuid moths at night. The relative importance of these insects as pollinators has not yet been established; however, carpenter bees are thought to be the main pollinators of amaryllis on the Cape Peninsula. The plant's main parasite is the lily borer Brithys crini and/or Diaphone eumela.

== Cultivation ==
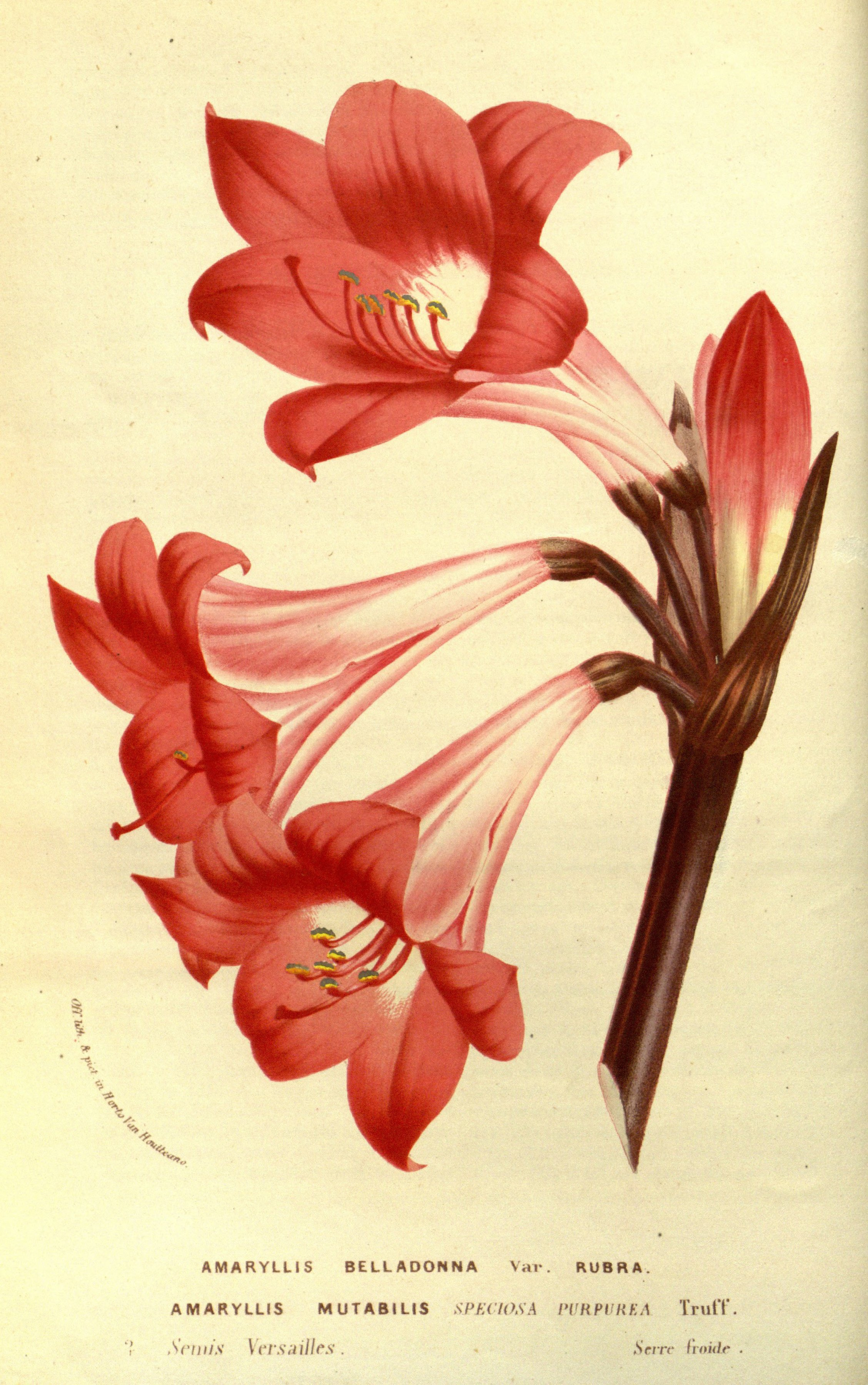
Amaryllis belladonna, illustration from "Flore des serres" volume 14, 1861

Amaryllis belladonna was introduced into cultivation at the beginning of the eighteenth century. It reproduces slowly by either bulb division or seeds and has gradually naturalized from plantings in urban and suburban areas throughout the lower elevations and coastal areas in much of the West Coast of the US since these environments mimic their native South African habitat. Hardiness zones 6–8. It is also naturalized in Australia.

There is an Amaryllis belladonna hybrid which was bred in the 1800s in Australia. No one knows the exact species it was crossed with to produce color variations of white, cream, peach, magenta and nearly red hues. The hybrids were crossed back onto the original Amaryllis belladonna and with each other to produce naturally seed-bearing crosses that come in a very wide range of flower sizes, shapes, stem heights and intensities of pink. Pure white varieties with bright green stems were bred as well. The hybrids are quite distinct in that the many shades of pink also have stripes, veining, darkened edges, white centers and light yellow centers, also setting them apart from the original light pink. In addition, the hybrids often produce flowers in a fuller circle rather than the "side-facing" habit of the "old-fashioned" pink. The hybrids are able to adapt to year-round watering and fertilization but can also tolerate completely dry summer conditions if need be.

A. belladonna has gained the Royal Horticultural Society's Award of Garden Merit.

Amaryllis belladonna has been crossed in cultivation with Crinum moorei to produce a hybrid called × Amarcrinum, which has named cultivars. Hybrids said to be between Amaryllis belladonna and Brunsvigia josephinae have been called × Amarygia. Neither hybrid genus name is accepted by the World Checklist of Selected Plant Families.

== Toxicity ==
Amaryllis belladonna is toxic to humans and to domestic animals, including dogs, cats, and horses. In animals, poisoning usually follows ingestion of the plant, particularly the bulbs. The toxic effects are associated with alkaloids, especially lycorine; several phenanthridine alkaloids have been identified in its leaves, stems, and bulbs, with the bulbs consistently described as the most hazardous part of the plant. In humans, ingestion is reported to cause vomiting, diarrhea, abdominal pain, hypersalivation, and tremors. In animals, reported signs include vomiting, excessive salivation, diarrhea, abdominal pain, respiratory difficulty, ataxia, seizures, and hypotension after larger exposures.

== See also ==
- List of plants known as lily
