= Bushmanland (South West Africa) =

Bantustan in South West Africa (1976–1989)

Coordinates: 19°35′S 20°31′E

Bushmanland Boesmanland Buschmannland
- 1976–1989
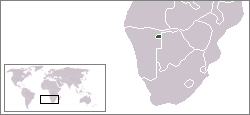
- Location of Bushmanland (green) within South West Africa (grey)

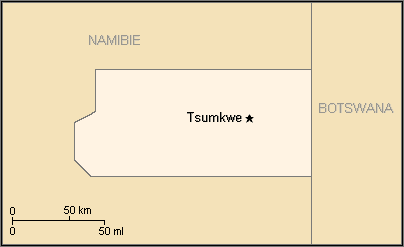
- Map of the Bantustan
- Status: Bantustan
- Capital: Tsumkwe (Tjumǃkui)
- Common languages: Khoisan; English; Afrikaans; German
- History
  - Establishment: 1976
  - Re-integrated into Namibia: May 1989
- Currency: South African rand
Preceded by	Succeeded by
South West Africa	Namibia

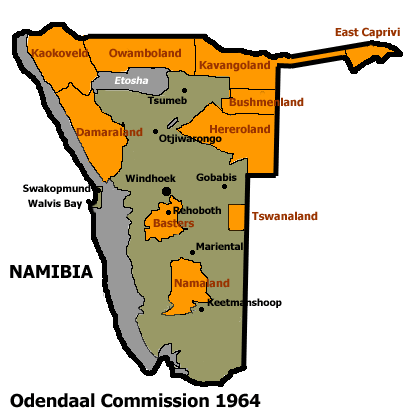
Allocation of land to Bantustans according to the Odendaal Plan. Bushmanland is in the north-east.

Bushmanland (Afrikaans: Boesmanland) was a Bantustan in South West Africa (present-day Namibia), intended by the apartheid government to be a self-governing homeland for the San people (the Bushmen).

== Administrative history ==
Bushmanland was established by the South African authorities with the issue of Proclamation 208 in 1976.

No government or second-tier authority was established for the San Bushmen as it was believed that "they had evinced no interest in having a governing authority". Instead, a Bushman Advisory Council was established in 1986.

Bushmanland, like other homelands in South West Africa, was replaced by a system of non-geographic ethnic-based administrations in 1980, which were in turn abolished in May 1989 at the start of the transition to independence.

== See also ==
- Bushmanland (South Africa)
- Apartheid
