= Bushmanland, Northern Cape =

Arid region in Namaqualand, South Africa

Bushmanland Boesmanland
- Arid area
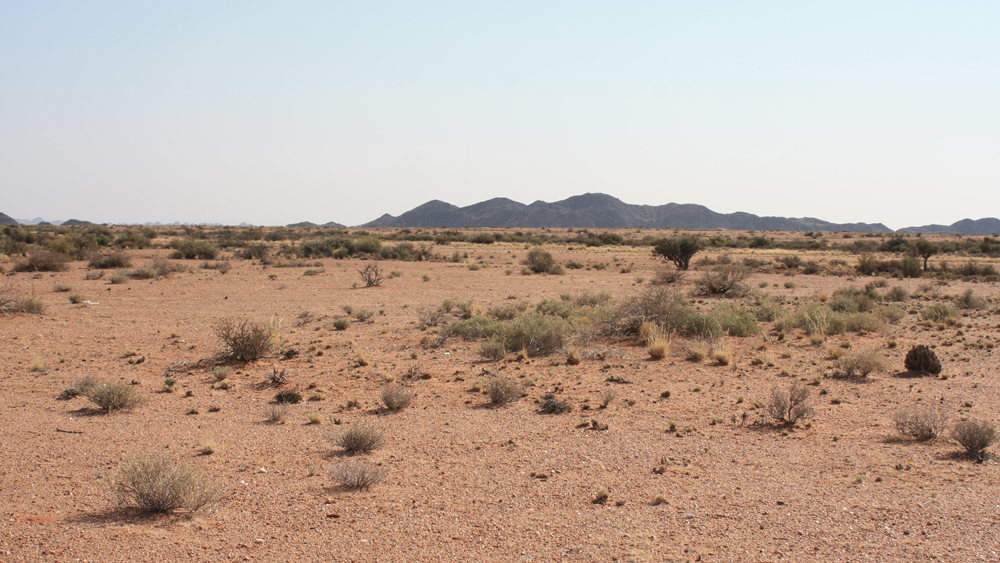
- Typical Boesmanland landscape

- Position of Boesmanland in Northern Cape Bushmanland (South Africa)
- Coordinates: 29.66667°S 19.75°E
- Country: South Africa
- Province: Northern Cape

Bushmanland is an arid area south of the Orange River and west of Kenhardt and east of Springbok (Namaqualand) in the Northern Cape, South Africa.

It includes the towns of Pofadder and Aggeneys, and places such as Namies and Bosluis Pan. Extensive plains are dotted with koppies like the Gamsberg.

Bushmanland is an arid area inland from Namaqualand. It is probably the most inhospitable area in South Africa, arid and largely with infertile soil and highly saline groundwater. Vaalputs, a nuclear waste repository, has been sited between Bushmanland and Namaqualand, and acts as a de facto nature reserve.

== See also ==
- Bushmanland (South West Africa)
- Bundu Farm site
