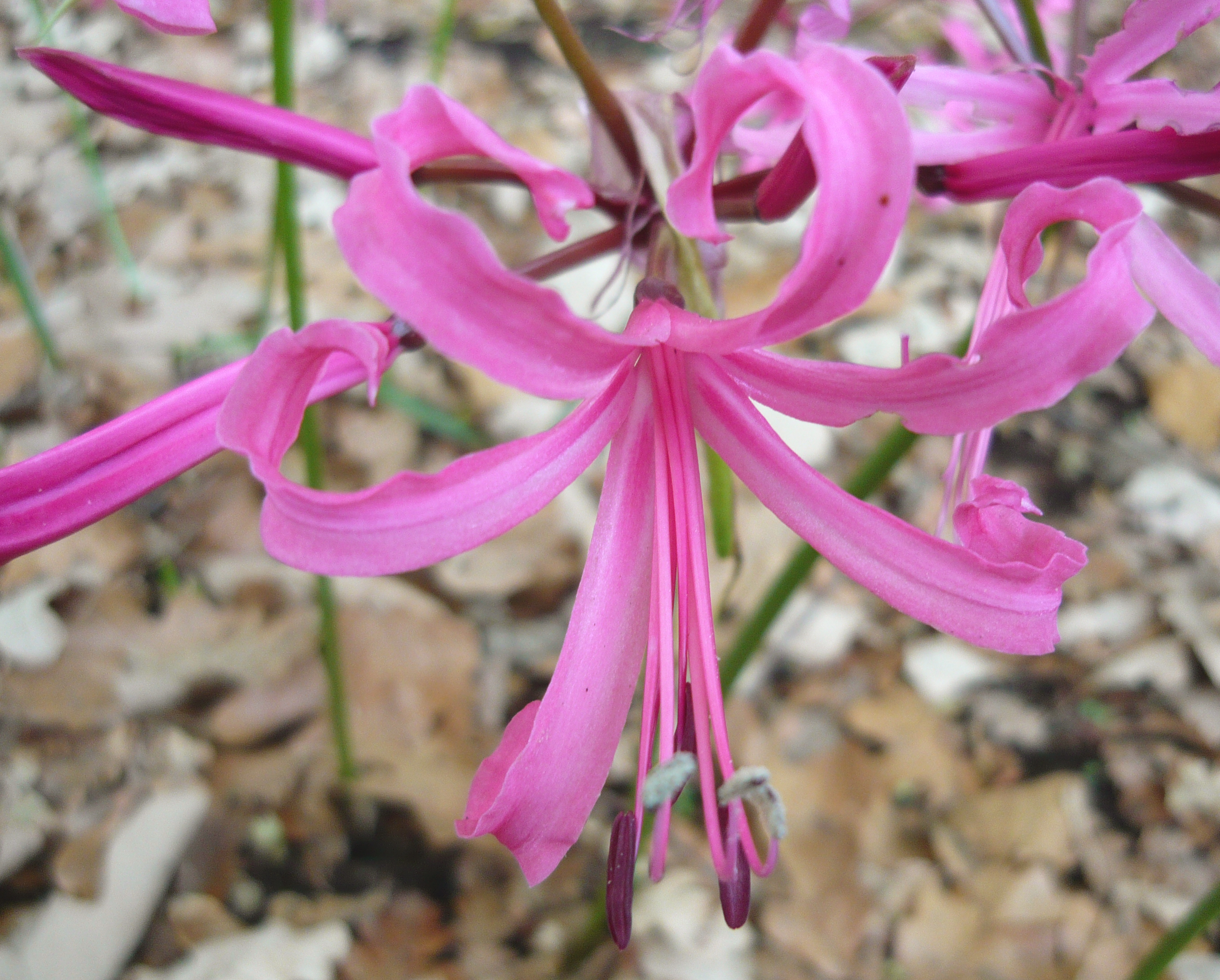

Scientific classification
- Kingdom: Plantae
- Clade: Tracheophytes
- Clade: Angiosperms
- Clade: Monocots
- Order: Asparagales
- Family: Amaryllidaceae
- Subfamily: Amaryllidoideae
- Genus: Nerine
- Species: N. bowdenii

Binomial name
- Nerine bowdenii Watson

= Nerine bowdenii =

Species of flowering plant

Nerine bowdenii is a species of flowering plant in the family Amaryllidaceae. It is an herbaceous bulbous perennial, growing to 45 cm (18 in) tall by 8 cm (3 in), with strap-shaped leaves and large umbels of lily-like pink flowers in late summer and autumn. The common names of the species are Cornish lily, Cape flower, Guernsey lily, and Bowden lily. However, it is neither a true lily nor from Cornwall or Guernsey, but originates from South Africa (Eastern Cape, KwaZulu Natal, Free State, Drakensberg Mountains). Confusingly the name "Guernsey lily" is also applied to a related species, Nerine sarniensis.

The species was named in 1904 after Athelstan Cornish-Bowden who had sent bulbs of the plant to England from South Africa.

== Description ==
N. bowdenii bulbs are 12 to 14 centimetres (4.7 to 5.5 in) in circumference. The bulbs are "shaped like old-fashioned Chianti bottles". The plant has eight or more faintly-scented bright pink flowers with frilly tips, resembling finely-cut lilies. Because the leaves do not appear until spring, the species can tolerate lower temperatures than most species in the genus Nerine.

== Cultivation ==
Nerine bowdenii is widely cultivated in temperate regions, where it requires warmth and shelter in colder areas, but is quite hardy, being able to withstand temperatures of −15 °C (5 °F). It needs to be planted where it cannot be disturbed for several years, and blooms best when the bulbs are crowded. The species grows best in heat and well-drained soil. However, it will not tolerate tropical or very humid weather. It is suggested that colchicums and cyclamens are good choices of companion plants to grow with this species.

=== Cultivars ===
The following cultivars have won the Royal Horticultural Society's Award of Garden Merit:-

- Nerine bowdenii (pink)
- 'Isabel' (deep pink)
- 'Quinton Wells' (bright pink)
- 'Stefanie' (pale pink, recurved petals)
- 'Zeal Giant' (deep salmon pink)

== Biochemistry ==
The bulbs of Nerine bowdenii contain ungeremine, a betaine-type alkaloid, and a number of other alkaloids. Ungeremine is an inhibitor of acetylcholinesterase, and as such may be of interest in research into treatment of Alzheimer's disease. Ungeremine also has been isolated from a number of related plant species, such as Ungernia minor, Ungernia spiralis, Zephyranthes flava, Crinum asiaticum, Crinum augustum, Pancratium maritimum and Hippeastrum solandriflorum.

== Diseases ==
The plant virus, vallota mosaic virus, has been found to infect Nerine bowdenii and other members of the genus Nerine in the UK.

== See also ==
- List of plants known as lily
