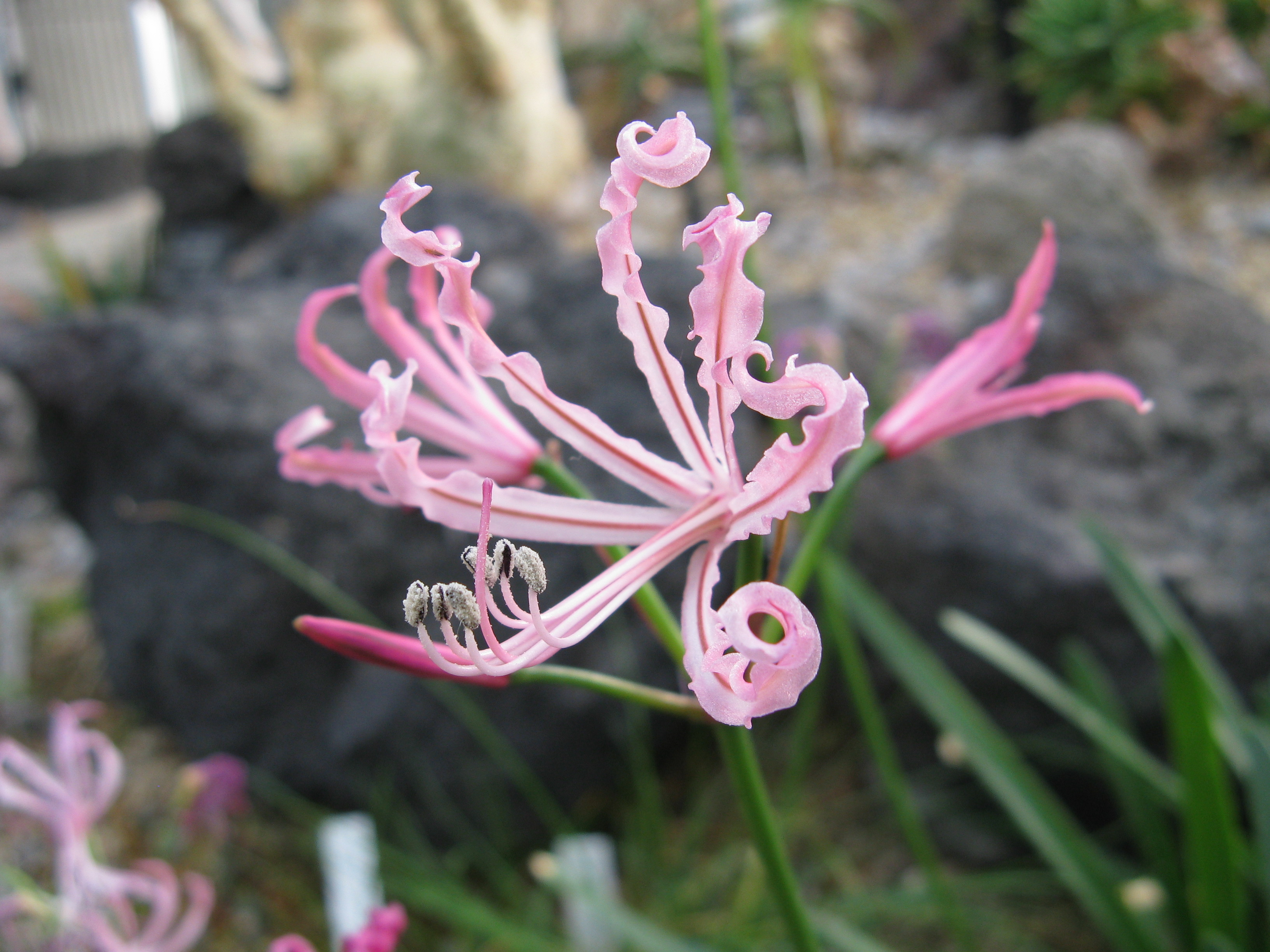

Scientific classification
- Kingdom: Plantae
- Clade: Tracheophytes
- Clade: Angiosperms
- Clade: Monocots
- Order: Asparagales
- Family: Amaryllidaceae
- Subfamily: Amaryllidoideae
- Genus: Nerine
- Species: N. humilis

Binomial name
- Nerine humilis (Jacq.) Herb.

= Nerine humilis =

Species of flowering plant

Nerine humilis, commonly known as dwarf nerine, is a species of flowering plant in the subfamily Amaryllidoideae of the family Amaryllidaceae, native to the Cape of South Africa. Growing to 40 cm (16 in) tall, it is a variable (polymorphic) bulbous perennial with narrow leaves appearing at the same time as umbels of 1–12 slender, crenellated flowers in shades of pink, in autumn. It is a summer dormant deciduous species, meaning that the top growth disappears for a period during summer months. Plants can be found in large colonies in their native habitat, the Fynbos of the Cape Floristic Region, appearing to respond well to the frequent fires in the area.

The Latin specific epithet humilis means "dwarf" or "low-growing". The plants are more likely to be dwarf in habit towards the western end of their range.

This plant has been given the Royal Horticultural Society's Award of Garden Merit. It does not tolerate being frozen, so requires some protection during the winter months. In cooler temperate zones it is best grown in a pot. Overcrowding of bulbs in a pot also improves flowering.
