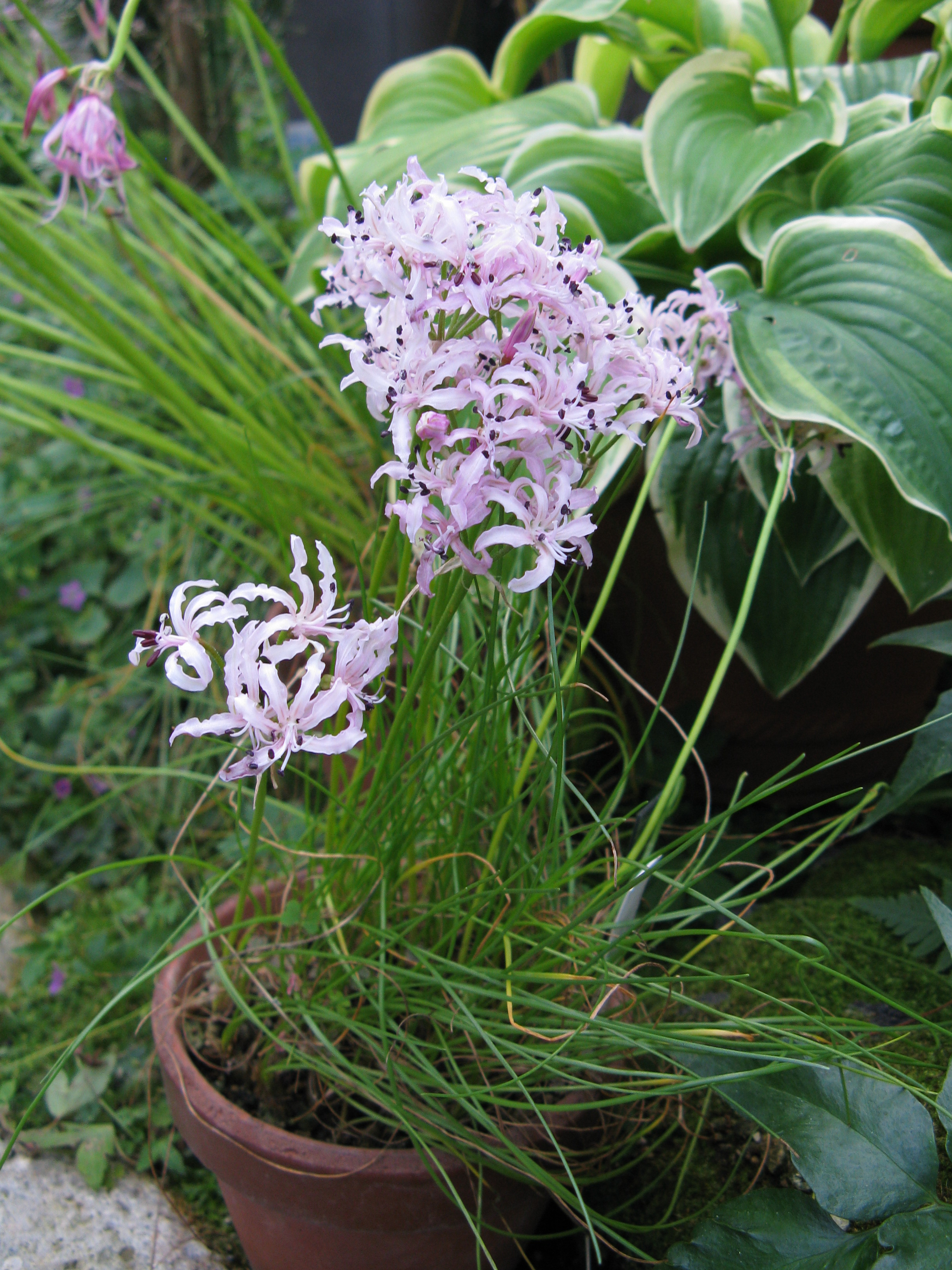
- In cultivation in Japan

Conservation status
- Critically Endangered (IUCN 3.1)

Scientific classification
- Kingdom: Plantae
- Clade: Tracheophytes
- Clade: Angiosperms
- Clade: Monocots
- Order: Asparagales
- Family: Amaryllidaceae
- Subfamily: Amaryllidoideae
- Genus: Nerine
- Species: N. masoniorum

Binomial name
- Nerine masoniorum L.Bolus

= Nerine masoniorum =

Species of flowering plant

Nerine masoniorum is a species of flowering plant in the family Amaryllidaceae, subfamily Amaryllidoideae, native to the eastern Cape Province of South Africa. It is a bulbous perennial belonging to the group of nerines that have narrow evergreen foliage. The thread-like leaves reach a length of 25 cm or more. The flowering stem is 15–25 cm tall, with up to 11 flowers arranged in an umbel. Each flower has six narrow pink tepals with wavy edges. It flowers in late summer in cultivation, the first of the nerines to do so. It has received the Royal Horticultural Society's Award of Garden Merit.

The species was named by Louisa Bolus in 1930. The specific epithet masoniorum honours Marianne Harriet Mason and her brother Edward Mason, who collected in southern and tropical Africa. (The spelling masonorum is also found.)

Nerine masoniorum is regarded as "critically endangered" by the South African National Biodiversity Institute. It is known from only two locations, one of which was reported in 2007 to have been lost to development.

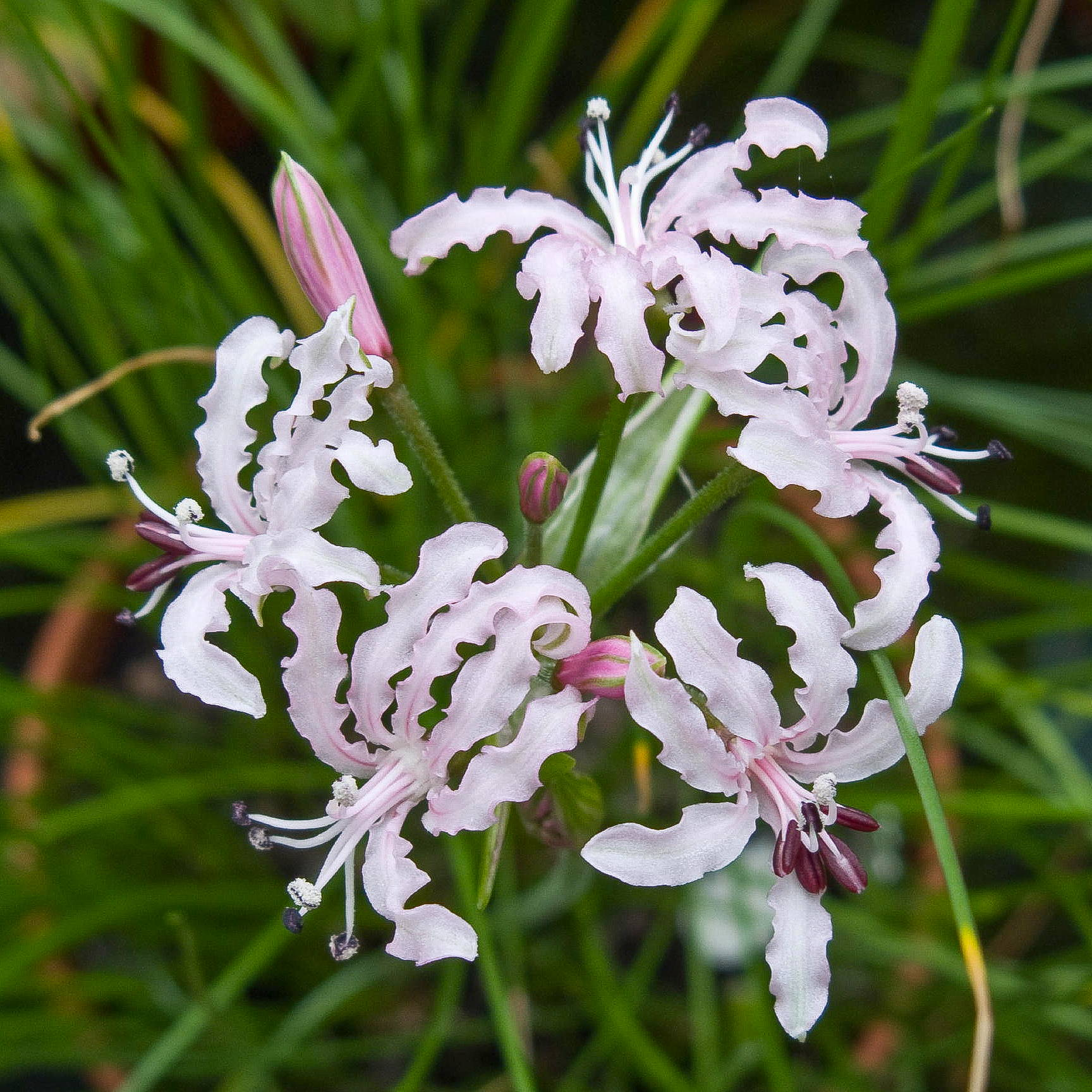
Inflorescence of cultivated plant
