= Ungeremine =

Names
- Preferred IUPAC name 2-Hydroxy-4,5-dihydro-10H-6λ^{5}-[1,3]dioxolo[4,5-j]pyrrolo[3,2,1-de]phenanthridin-6-ylium

Identifiers
CAS Number	2121-12-2
3D model (JSmol)	Interactive image
ChEMBL	ChEMBL253553
ChemSpider	140368
KEGG	C12189
PubChem CID	159646
UNII	9EVC5B2RPS
CompTox Dashboard (EPA)	DTXSID50175439
- InChI: InChI=1S/C16H11NO3/c18-11-3-9-1-2-17-7-10-4-14-15(20-8-19-14)6-12(10)13(5-11)16(9)17/h3-7H,1-2,8H2/p+1 Key: DFQOXFIPAAMFAU-UHFFFAOYSA-O; InChI=1/C16H11NO3/c18-11-3-9-1-2-17-7-10-4-14-15(20-8-19-14)6-12(10)13(5-11)16(9)17/h3-7H,1-2,8H2/p+1 Key: DFQOXFIPAAMFAU-IKLDFBCSAD
- SMILES: C1C[N+]2=CC3=CC4=C(C=C3C5=CC(=CC1=C52)O)OCO4

Properties
Chemical formula	C_{16}H_{12}NO_{3}^{+1}
Molar mass	266.275 g·mol^{−1}
- Except where otherwise noted, data are given for materials in their standard state (at 25 °C [77 °F], 100 kPa). Infobox references

Ungeremine is a betaine-type alkaloid isolated from Nerine bowdenii and related plants such as Pancratium maritimum. Pharmacologically, it is of interest as an acetylcholinesterase inhibitor and accordingly as possibly relevant to Alzheimer's disease. It also has been investigated as a bactericide.
