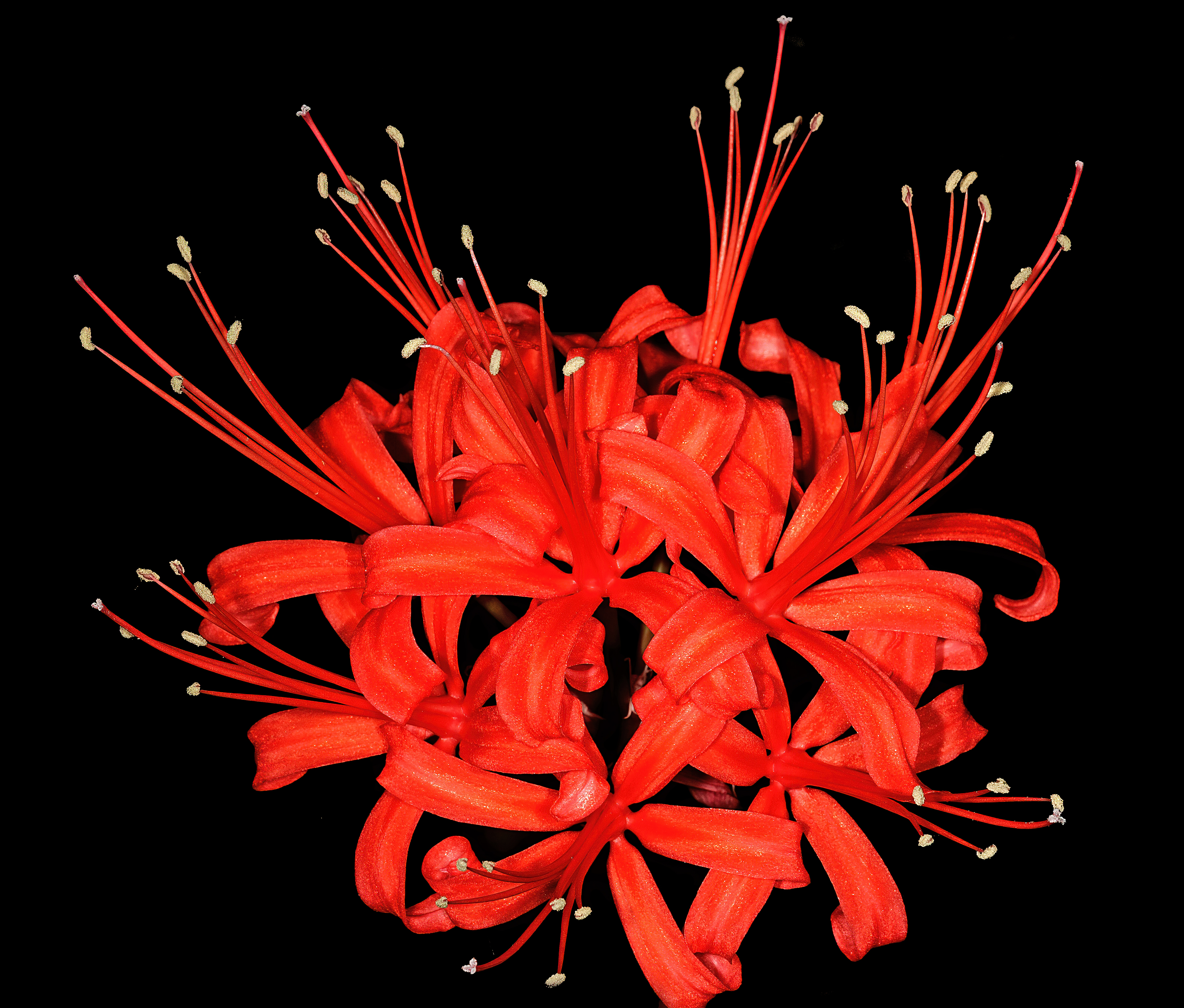
- Nerine sarniensis

Scientific classification
- Kingdom: Plantae
- Clade: Tracheophytes
- Clade: Angiosperms
- Clade: Monocots
- Order: Asparagales
- Family: Amaryllidaceae
- Subfamily: Amaryllidoideae
- Subtribe: Strumariinae
- Genus: Nerine; Herb., nom. cons.

Type species
- Nerine sarniensis (L.) Herb.

Species
- See text

Synonyms
- Imhofia Heist., nom. rej.; Galatea Herb., nom. nud.; Laticoma Raf.; Elisena M.Roem., nom. illeg.; Loxanthes Salisb.

= Nerine =

Genus of flowering plants

Nerine /nɪˈraɪniː/ (nerines, Guernsey lily, Jersey lily, spider lily) is a genus of flowering plants belonging to the family Amaryllidaceae, subfamily Amaryllidoideae. They are bulbous perennials, some evergreen, associated with rocky and arid habitats. They bear spherical umbels of lily-like flowers in shades from white through pink to crimson. In the case of deciduous species, the flowers may appear on naked stems before the leaves develop. Native to South Africa, there are about 20–30 species in the genus. Though described as lilies, they are not significantly related to the true lilies (Liliaceae), but more closely resemble their relatives, Amaryllis and Lycoris. The genus was established by the Revd. William Herbert in 1820.

Nerines have been widely cultivated and much hybridized worldwide, especially Nerine bowdenii, N. masoniorum, N. sarniensis and N. undulata (previously known as N. flexuosa). The hybrid cultivar 'Zeal Giant' has gained the Royal Horticultural Society's Award of Garden Merit. Most of the other 20 species are rarely cultivated and very little is known regarding their biology. Many species are threatened with extinction due to the loss or degradation of their habitat.

== Description ==
Figure 1. Morphological features

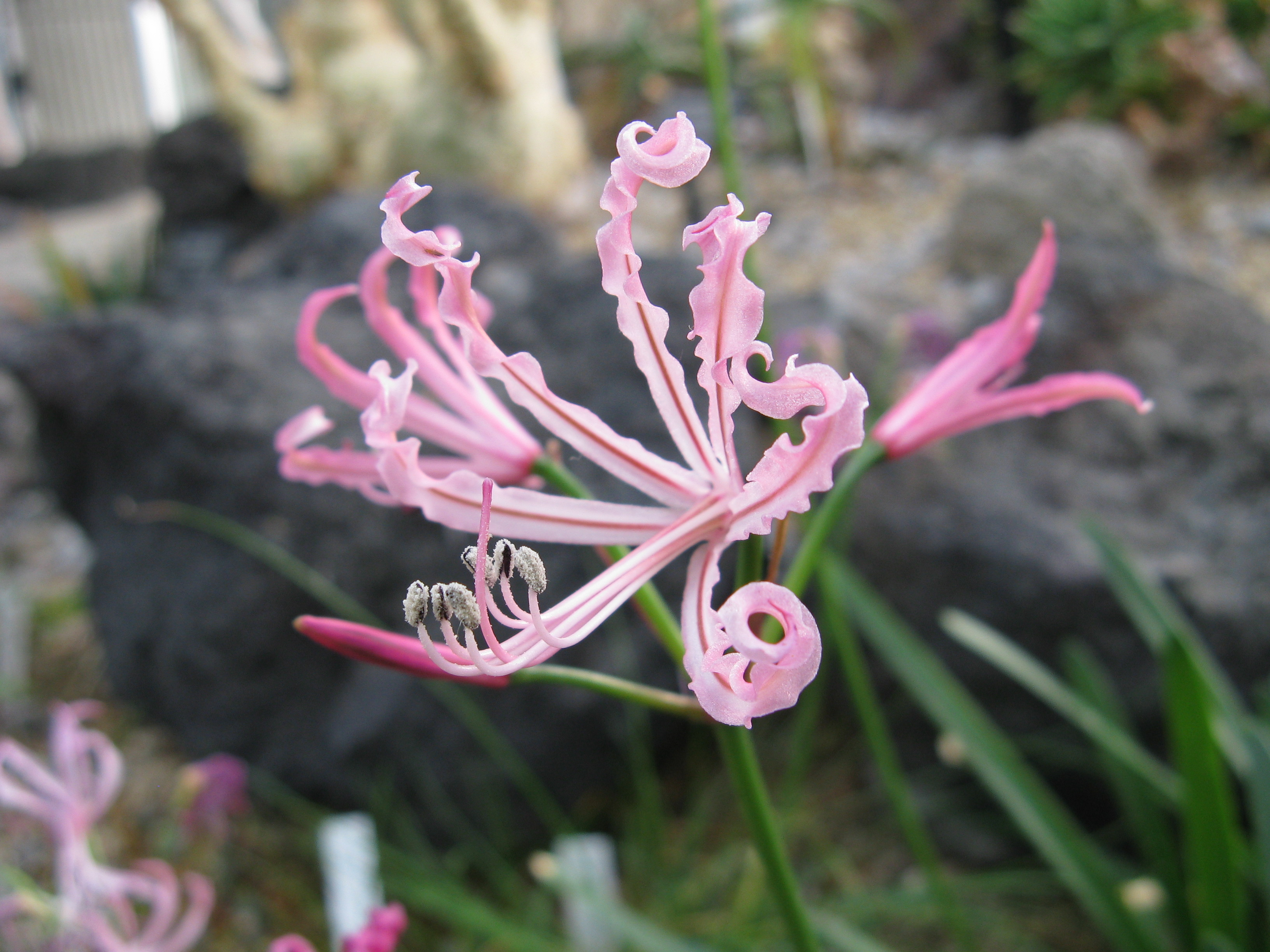
A. N. humilis: Style, 6 stamens, 6 wavy tepals with crisped margins

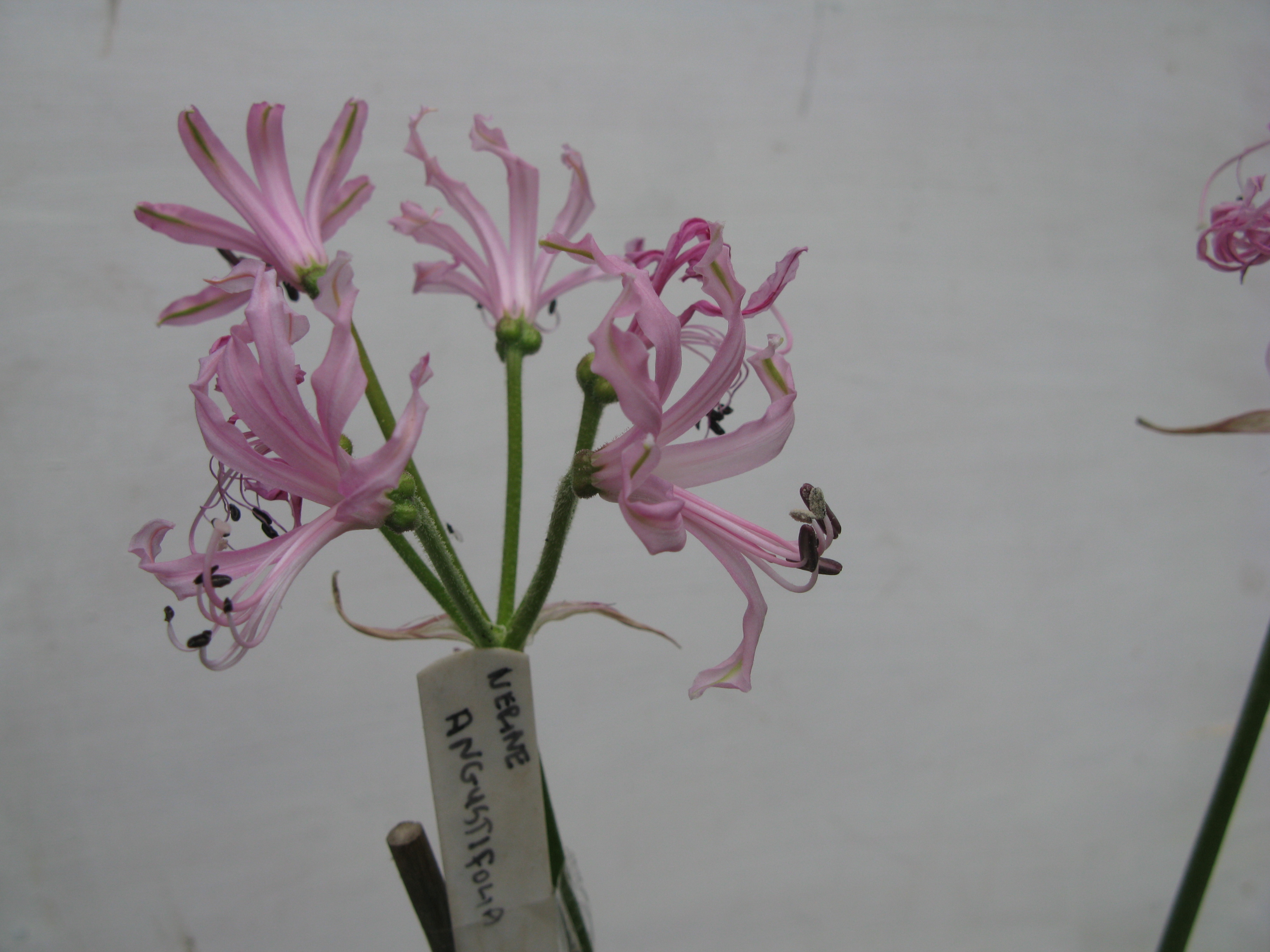
B. N. angustifolia: Umbellate inflorescence with flowers on pedicls

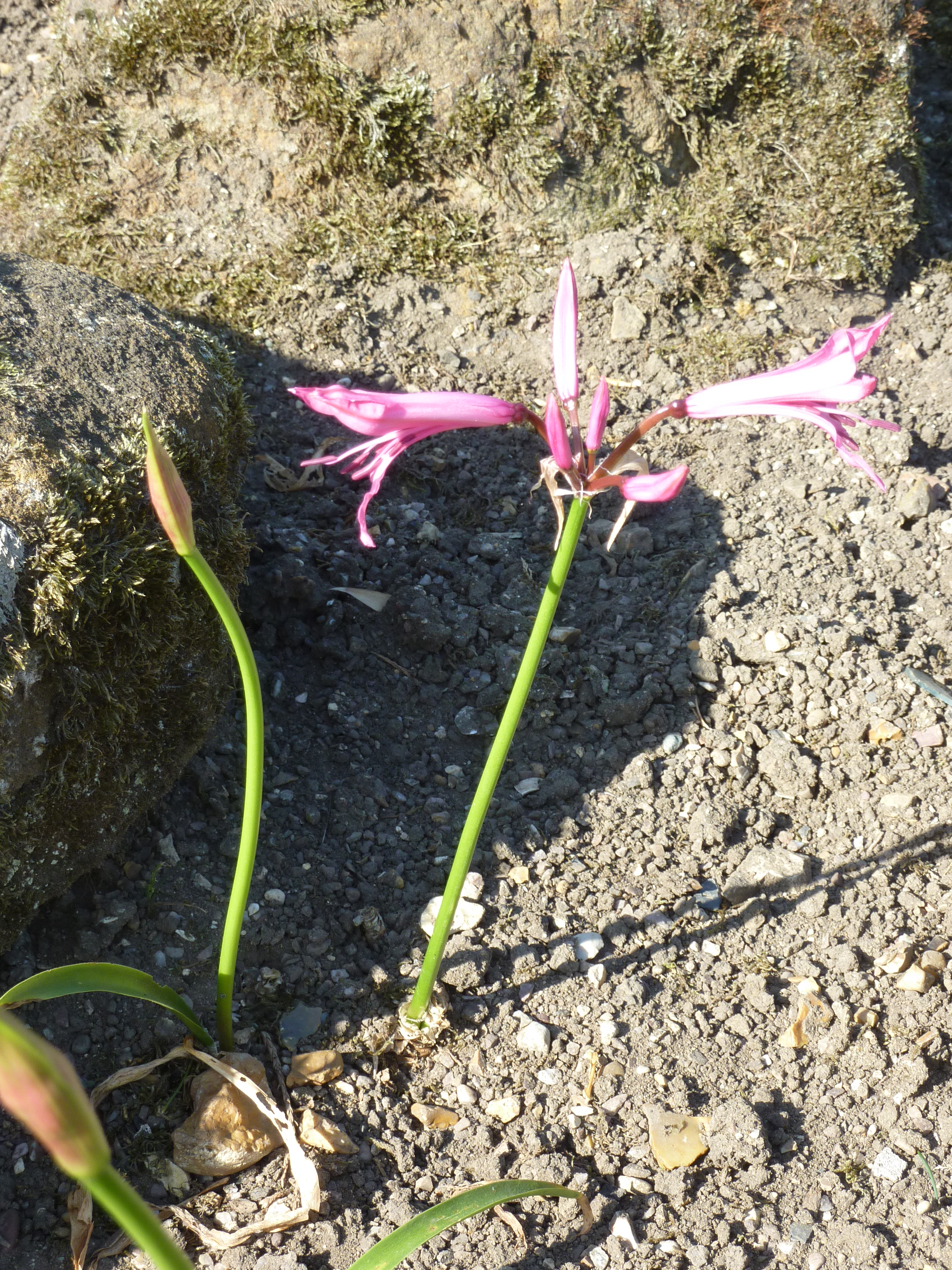
C. N. bowdenii: Flowers on leafless stem

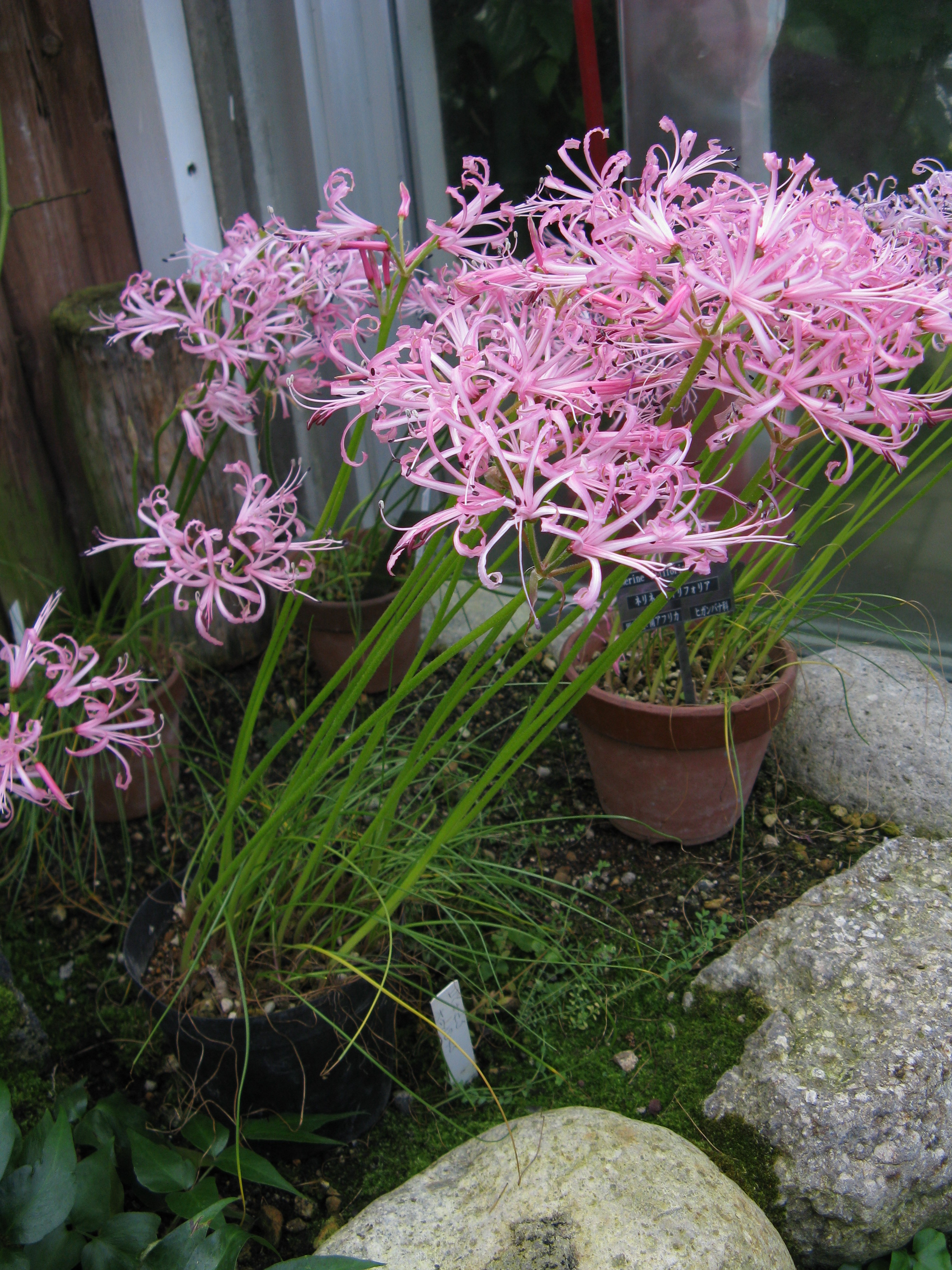
D. N. filifolia: Filiform leaves

Species of Nerine are herbaceous perennial bulbous flowering plants. In the case of deciduous species, the inflorescence may appear on naked stems before the leaves develop (hysteranthy), otherwise they appear together with the flowers (synanthy) or afterwards.

The bulbs may have a short neck, but this is absent in other species. The leaves are filiform (threadlike) (as in N. filifolia; Figure 1D) to linear and flat and strap-shaped (as in N. humilis; Figure 2C). Their flowers, which are few, are borne in spherical umbels on a solid leafless stem (scape or peduncle). The stem may be slender or robust, and rarely minutely puberulous (hairy), with two lanceolate (lance shaped) spathe-valves (spathal bracts) surrounding the inflorescence. The pedicels (flower stalks) may be glabrous (hairy) or smooth, a feature used in differentiating species.

Individual flowers are lily-like, generally with a perianth that is zygomorphic (with one plane of symmetry) but may be actinomorphic (radially symmetrical or "regular"). Each flower is flared, usually with a short extended or recurved perianth tube, consisting of six narrow white, pink or red tepals (perianth segments) joined at the base to form the tube. The free parts of the tepals are generally narrowly oblanceolate (wider near tip) and undulate (wavy) with crisped (curly) margins.

The six stamens may be declinate (curvy) or erect, are unequal and are inserted into the base of the tepals, and are connate (fused) at their bases, frequently protruding from the flower. The stamen filaments are thin and filiform, but may be appendiculate (bearing appendages) at their base, a feature that is also important in differentiating species. Their anthers are versatile (swinging freely) and oblong and attach to the filament at the back (dorsifixed). The pollen is bisulcate (two grooves).

The inferior ovary is subglobose (slightly flattened sphere) and trilocular (three-lobed or three locules), with one to four ovules in each loculus. The style is filiform, straight or declinate and has an obscurely tricuspidate (three tipped) stigmatose apex. The fruit is a subglobose dry loculicidal dehiscent capsule, that produces between one and a few seeds per loculus that are globose to ovoid, red-green and often viviparous (begin to develop before separating).

Chromosome number: 11 (2n=22), but rarely 2n=24 or triploids.

== Taxonomy ==
=== History ===
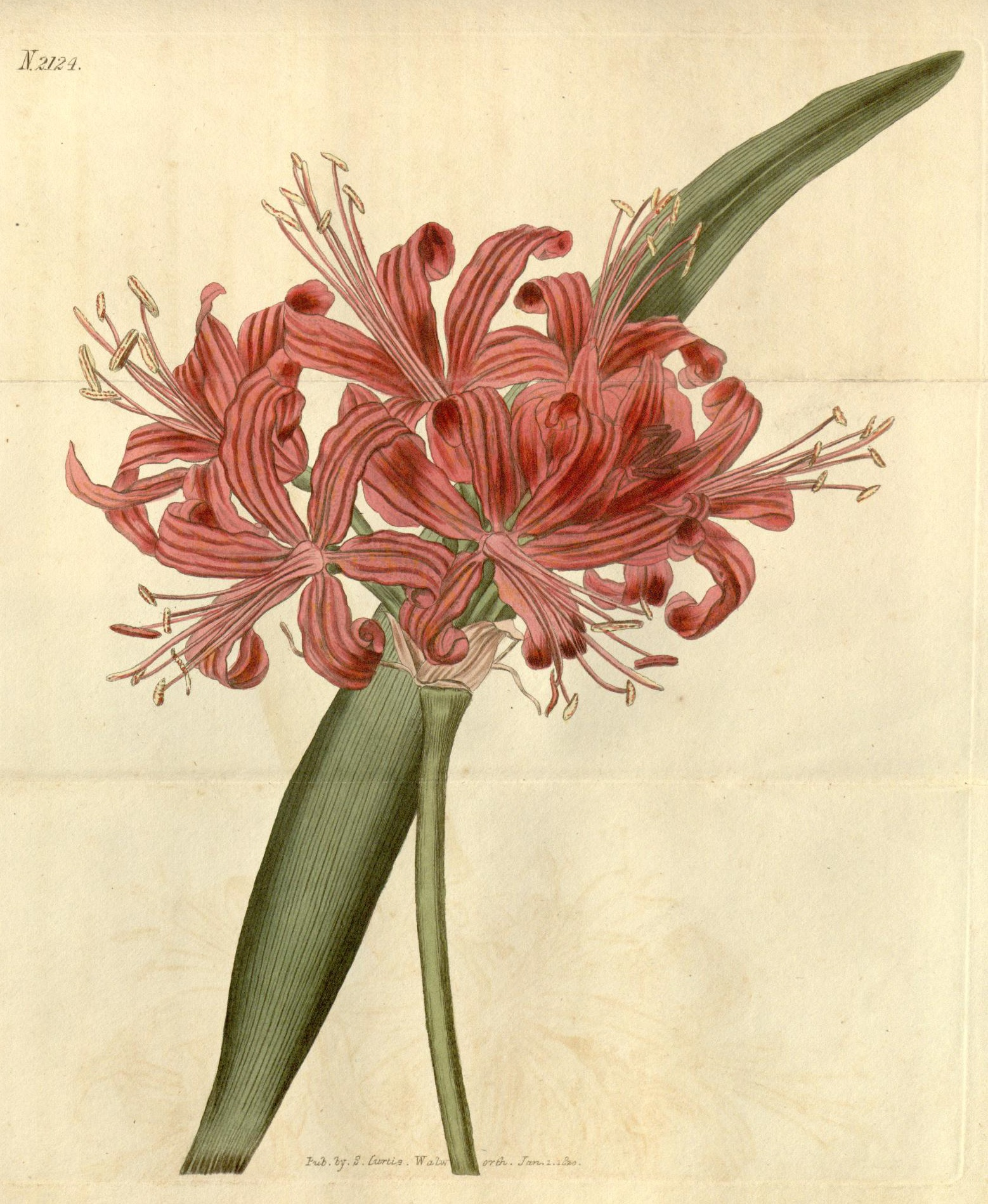
Herbert's 1820 illustration of N. rosea (N. sarniensis)

The first description was published in 1635 by French botanist Jacques-Philippe Cornut, who examined 'Narcissus Iaponicus rutilo flore' (N. sarniensis), a plant he found in the garden of the Paris nurseryman Jean Morin in October 1634, assuming it was originally from Japan. In 1680 Scottish botanist Robert Morison gave an account of 'Lilio-Narcissus Japonicus rutilo flore' that was said to have been washed ashore when a Dutch or English vessel coming from Japan was wrecked off Guernsey. In 1725 James Douglas published an account in his A Description of the Guernsay Lilly, as it was known then. Douglas gave it the name Lilio-Narcissus Sarniensis Autumno florens. (Note: Narcisso-Lirion Sarniense in the first edition, but adopting the continental usage Lilio-Narcissus Sarniensis Autumno florens in the second. He also used the term Lilium Sarniense vulgo as a common name.) Linnaeus called this Amaryllis sarniensis in 1753, after Douglas' usage, one of nine species he assigned to this genus.

The earliest published name for the genus was Imhofia, given by Lorenz Heister in 1755. The later name Nerine, published by William Herbert in 1820, was widely used, resulting in a decision to conserve the name Nerine and reject the name Imhofia (nom. rej.). Herbert was unaware of Heister's work initially in 1820, but noting that Heister had not defined it and it had not been adopted, transferred the name to Amaryllis marginata, retaining Nerine for N. sarniensis and renaming A. marginata Imhofia marginata (now Brunsvigia marginata).

Herbert's main role was in untangling a number of distinct genera that Linnaeus had included under Amaryllis. Although in Herbert's description of Nerine rosea there, he attempted to distinguish it from N. sarniensis, the former is now accepted as a synonym of the latter, the accepted name. When Herbert chose the name of these nymphs for the first species of the genus, Nerine sarniensis, he alluded to the story of how this South African species arrived on the island of Guernsey in the English Channel. It is said that a ship carrying boxes of the bulbs of this species destined for the Netherlands was shipwrecked on Guernsey. The boxes of bulbs were washed up on the island and the bulbs became established and multiplied around the coast. Herbert eventually recognised nine species. At that time Amaryllis (and hence Nerine) were placed in the family Amaryllideae, following the classification of de Candolle (1813). Herbert's main interests were in the taxonomy of amaryllids, publishing a monograph on this in 1837, considering Amaryllideae as one of seven suborders of Amaryllidaceae. He then further subdivided this suborder into groups, placing Nerine and Amaryllis together with twelve other genera into the Amaryllidiformes. In his extensive treatment of Nerine he divided the nine species he recognised into two sections, Regulares and Distortae, of which only N. humilis and N. undulata are still in use. He had also begun a breeding program and described seven hybrids he had raised. His enthusiasm for the genus is evident in that he chose to illustrate the front of the book with one of his hybrids, N. mitchamiae (see illustration).

New species continued to be described so that by the time Traub published his monograph in 1967, he identified 30 species. Other authors, including Norris (1974) and Duncan (2002), have identified 31 and 25 species respectively. At one stage 53 species were described. Snijman and Linder (1996), who used a cladistic analysis of 33 characteristics and chromosome number, reduced this to 23, assigning many of these species to varietal status. They considered Nerine to be characterised by zygomorphic flowers with attenuated tepals and crisped margins.

=== Phylogeny ===
In the APG IV system (2016), the genus Nerine is placed in the subfamily Amaryllidoideae of a broadly defined family Amaryllidaceae. Within the subfamily, Nerine is placed in the Southern African tribe Amaryllideae. The phylogenetic relationships of the Amaryllideae have been investigated through molecular analysis of DNA combined with morphological data. This cladistic analysis has demonstrated that Nerine belongs to a monophyletic group forming subtribe Strumariinae. The members of this clade all originate from South Africa and often have prostrate leaves, fused stamens forming a tube towards the base of the flower, dehiscent fruit, and seeds with a well developed seed coat and chlorophyll. Within the Strumariinae, Nerine is most closely related to Brunsvigia Heist., Namaquanula D. & U. Müll.-Doblies and Hessea Herb.

The genera of Strumariinae are related as in this cladogram, with number of species in each genus in (parentheses):

- Strumariinae
  - - - Nerine (~23)
      - - - - Brunsvigia (~23)
            - Namaquanula (2)
          - Hessea (13)
    - Strumaria (24)
  - Crossyne (2)

=== Subdivision ===
Attempts to generate an infrageneric classification (such as those of Traub's four sections and Norris' twelve groups) based on morphological characteristics alone relied on the presence of appendages to the bases of the stamen filaments, the presence of hairs on the ovary, scape and pedicels, together with the shape and arrangement of perianth segments. Traub divided the genus into four subgeneric sections, Nerine, Laticomae, Bowdeniae and Appendiculatae. For instance the six taxa of Laticomae were grouped on the basis of filaments that were not distinctly appendiculate or otherwise modified at the base and scapes that were relatively short and stout.

Much of the modern understanding of the genus comes from the work of Graham Duncan and colleagues at SANBI, Kirstenbosch. In 2002 Duncan grouped the species of Nerine by growth cycle, with three distinct patterns. Nerine species can be either evergreen or deciduous, the deciduous species either growing during the winter or the summer. Zonnefeld and Duncan (2006) examined the total amount of nuclear DNA by flow cytometry in 81 accessions from 23 species. When the species were arranged by DNA content, five groupings (A–E) were apparent, that correlated with growth cycle and leaf width, but only two of the other characteristics (filament appendages and hairy pedicels). Traub's sections were not confirmed, although a slightly better agreement was found with Norris' groups. Leaf width fell into two main groups, narrow (1–4 mm) or broad (6–37 mm). When taken together these characteristics confirm Duncan's original three groups based on growth cycle alone.

The first of these is the largest of these groups, corresponding to DNA groups A, B and C, with 13 species, and contains narrow-leafed evergreen nerines that retain their leaves throughout the summer and winter. They contain the lowest amount of DNA per nucleus. The second group corresponds to DNA group D with four broad-leafed deciduous winter growing species. They contain an intermediate amount of DNA. A third group (DNA group E) has six broad-leafed summer growing deciduous species that have no leaves in the winter. They contain the highest amount of DNA. The two broad-leaved groups are also distinguished by the absence of filamentous appendages and glabrous pedicels, although two of the species have hairs on the pedicels, but these are minute or sparse.

The first group (the evergreens) can then be considered to have three subgroups corresponding to DNA groups A, B and C but also by other characteristics. N. marincowitzii is an outlier being summer growing but narrow-leafed. The other outlier is N. pusilla which is narrow-leafed despite being summer growing. N. duparquetiana has at times been considered to be a synonym of N. laticoma but was restored to species status here. N. huttoniae is another species whose status is disputed, but here is treated (as Traub did) as a subspecies of N. laticoma, a status subsequently confirmed. Two species of doubtful status were not accessed, N. transvaalensis and N. hesseoides.

Based on morphology, geography and DNA content they concluded that there were in fact 23 species, in contrast to the large number of subspecies considered by Traub.

==== Species list ====
As of 2016, the World Checklist of Selected Plant Families (WCLSPF) recognises 24 species and The Plant List (TPL), 25 (for explanation of the discrepancy, see Notes). Species accepted by the WCLSPF and arranged sensu Zonnefeld & Duncan Table 2 are: (Note: Both include the hybrid Nerine x versicolor, which Zonnefeld & Duncan did not)

- Groups A, B and C. Narrow-leafed and evergreen, 18.0–24.6 pg DNA per nucleus
  - Group A Absent filamentous appendages, glabrous pedicels, 18 pg DNA
    - Nerine gaberonensis Bremek. & Oberm. – Botswana to Northern Cape Province
    - Nerine rehmannii (Baker) L.Bolus – Northern Cape Province to Eswatini
    - Nerine marincowitzii Snijman – South west of Cape Province (summer growing)
  - Group B Absent filamentous appendages, hairy pedicels, 20–22 pg DNA
    - Nerine filamentosa W.F.Barker – Eastern Cape Province
    - Nerine filifolia Baker – Eastern Cape Province
    - Nerine pancratioides Baker – KwaZulu-Natal
    - Nerine platypetala McNeil – Mpumalanga
  - Group C Filamentous appendages, hairy pedicels, 22–25 pg DNA
    - Nerine angustifolia (Baker) W.Watson – South Africa
    - Nerine appendiculata Baker – South east of Cape Province to KwaZulu-Natal
    - Nerine frithii L.Bolus – South Africa
    - Nerine gibsonii K.H.Douglas – Eastern Cape Province
    - Nerine gracilis R.A.Dyer – Northern Cape Province
    - Nerine masoniorum L.Bolus – Eastern Cape Province
- Group D. Broad-leafed deciduous winter growing, 25.3–26.2 pg DNA. Absent filamentous appendages, glabrous pedicels
  - Nerine humilis (Jacq.) Herb. – Cape Province
  - Nerine pudica Hook.f. – South west Cape Province
  - Nerine ridleyi E.Phillips – South west of Cape Province
  - Nerine sarniensis (L.) Herb. – South west of Cape Province Type species
- Group E. Broad-leafed deciduous summer growing, 26.8–35.3 pg DNA. Absent filamentous appendages, glabrous pedicels
  - Nerine bowdenii W.Watson – Eastern Cape Province to KwaZulu-Natal
  - Nerine duparquetiana (Baill.) Baker (sparse pedicel hair) (Note: Treated as N. laticoma subsp. laticoma by WCLSPF, but as species by Zonneveld & Duncan)
  - Nerine krigei W.F.Barker – Zimbabwe to Northern Cape Province
  - Nerine laticoma (Ker Gawl.) T.Durand & Schinz – Southern Zimbabwe to Northern Cape Province
    - Nerine huttoniae Schönland – Eastern Cape Province (Note: Treated as species by TPL but as N. laticoma subsp. huttoniae by Zonneveld & Duncan and WCLSPF)
  - Nerine pusilla Dinter – East and central Namibia (narrow-leafed, sparse pedicel hair))
  - Nerine undulata (L.) Herb. – Eastern Cape Province (winter and summer growing)
- Other (not accessed) (Note: Both accepted by WC:SPF and TPL)
  - Nerine hesseoides L.Bolus – Northern Cape Province to Free State (Note: Probably subspecies or variety of N. frithii)
  - Nerine transvaalensis L.Bolus – Northern Cape Province (Note: Described in 1928 and not seen since, possible subspecies of N. frithii)

=== Species assigned to other genera ===
- Nerine aurea (syn. Lycoris aurea)

=== Hybrids ===
Some known hybrids, along with the parent species, are the following:

- Nerine × excellens T.Moore = N. humilis × N. undulata, an artificial cross
- Nerine × mansellii O'Brien ex Baker = N. undulata × N. sarniensis, an artificial cross
- Nerine × stricklandii auct. = N. pudica × N. sarniensis, an artificial cross
- Nerine × traubianthe Moldenke = N. filifolia × N. 'Rosalba', an artificial cross
- Nerine × versicolor Herb. = N. sarniensis × N. undulata – Cape Province

Some Nerine species have been used to produce a hybrid with members of the genus Amaryllis, which are included in the hybrid genus (nothogenus) × Amarine. One of these hybrids is × Amarine tubergenii Sealy, which comes from a cross between Amaryllis belladonna and Nerine bowdenii.

=== Etymology ===
The genus name given to it by Herbert in 1820 derives from the Nereids (sea-nymphs) of Greek mythology that protected sailors and their ships. Herbert combined Morison's account of the plant being washed ashore from a shipwreck with Renaissance poetry, alluding to the rescue of Vasco da Gama’s ship by a Nereid in the epic poem of Camões, Os Lusiadas. Although bearing the name "lily" in the vernacular, Nerine is only distantly related to the true lilies (Lilium) of the lily family, Liliaceae, sensu stricto. Instead they are one of many genera placed in the amaryllid lily family, Amaryllidaceae, such as the closely related Amaryllis, and Lycoris. These were once part of the much larger construction of Liliaceae sensu lato. The name "spider lily" is shared by a number of different genera within Amaryllidaceae. For instance, Lycoris aurea may be sold under its earlier synonym, Nerine aurea.

== Distribution and habitat ==
Nerine are native to Southern Africa, their distribution range being from the Cape Peninsula in the south to Botswana, Eswatini, Lesotho, Namibia to the northwest and northeast of South Africa, occupying all nine provinces of South Africa. (see distribution maps in Zonneveld & Duncan, 2006). They prefer rocky, arid and mesic habitats, and most species are found in the summer rainfall region.

== Ecology ==
Nerine species form three distinct growth patterns, namely winter-growing, summer-growing and evergreen species. While the flowers are generally pink, a red colour is an adaptation to a pollinator, the butterfly Aeropetes tulbaghia.

== Conservation ==
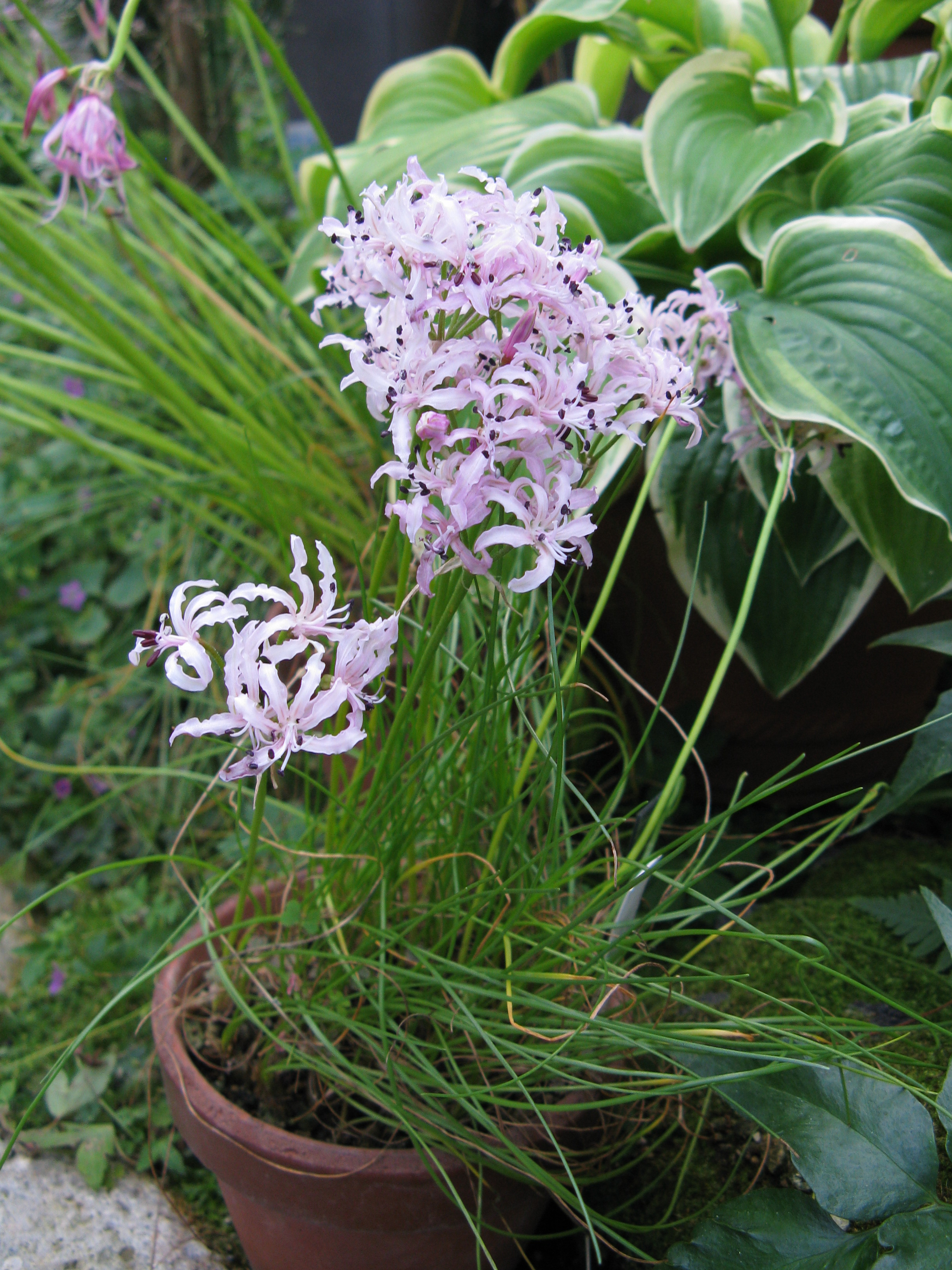
N. masoniorum

Some Nerine species from Eastern Cape Province are naturally rare, but they are not considered to be in immediate danger of extinction. These include the winter-growing species N. pudica that inhabits inaccessible locations in the Du Toitskloof and Sonderend mountains, and the summer-growing N. marincowitzii that originates from the semi-arid Karoo region.

A number of evergreen nerine species from areas of South Africa that have summer rain are in danger due to the loss or degradation of their habitat and at least two or three of them are on the verge of extinction. Nerine masoniorum is probably the most critically threatened and it may even have become extinct as the area occupied by the only surviving colony has been used for the construction of housing. Another species that is seriously threatened is N. gibsonii from Eastern Cape Province as the grasslands that it grows in have been seriously damaged by overgrazing and erosion resulting from the construction of paths and roads. In addition, this species rarely produces seeds as grazing cattle eat the flowers as soon as they appear.

Various measures have been taken to relieve the threat of extinction from these species. One of these measures, thanks to their ease of cultivation, is the ex situ conservation of a number of populations of N. filamentosa, N. gibsonii, N. gracilis, N. huttoniae and N. masoniorum in the Kirstenbosch botanical garden. Another measure, this time relating to in situ cultivation is the official protection of some species in nature reserves, such as has happened for N. platypetala in the south of Mpumalanga.

In Guernsey, the national flower is Nerine sarniensis, and the island collection of nerines is seeking recognition by National Council for the Conservation of Plants and Gardens as a national collection.

== Cultivation ==
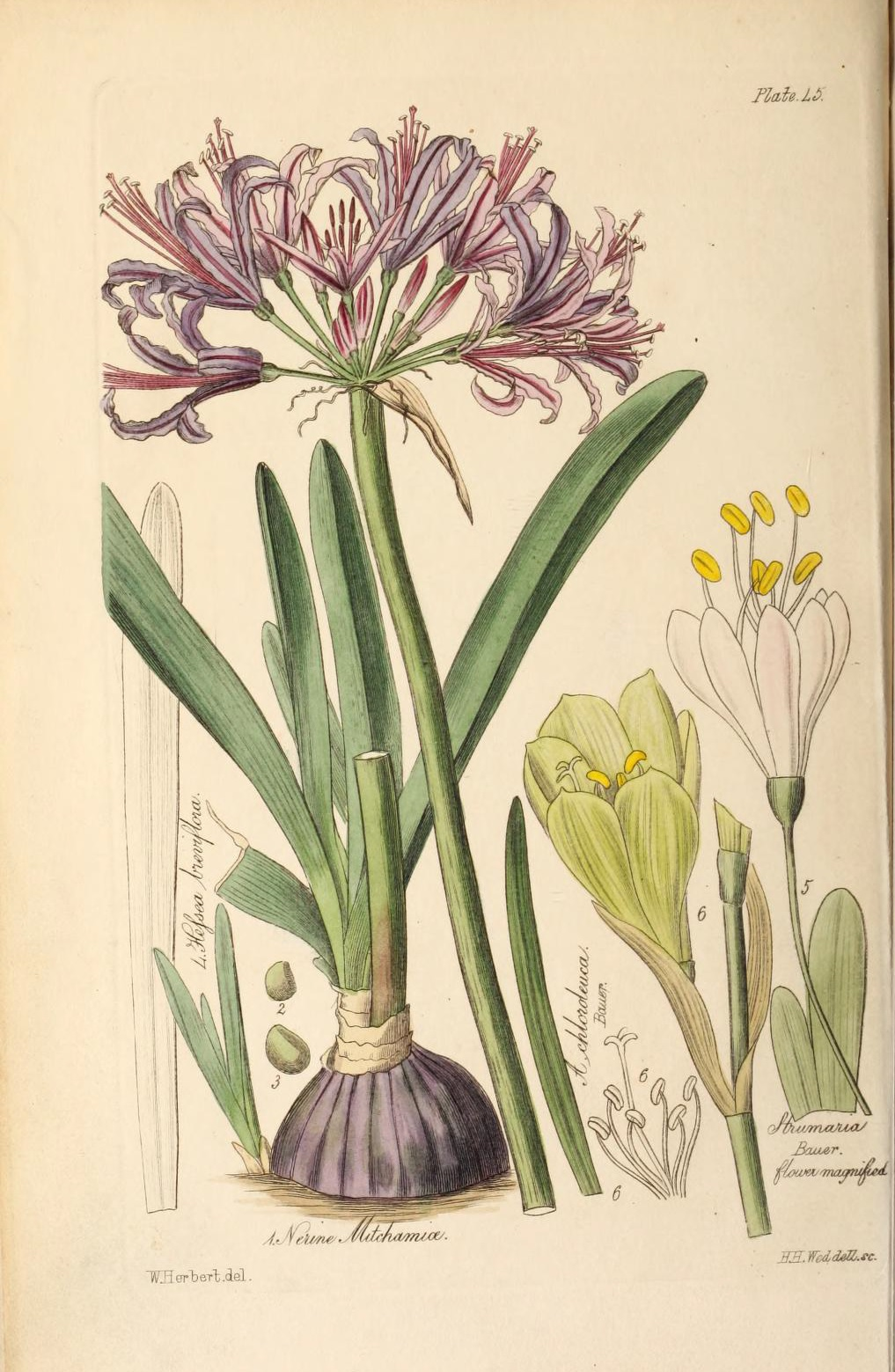
William Herbert's hybrid, N. mitchamiae (left) from Frontispiece to his Amaryllidaceae 1837

Breeding and hybridisation of Nerine began as early as the beginning of the nineteenth century with the work of William Herbert. A number of the species of this genus are cultivated as ornamentals, such as N. sarniensis, N. undulata (N. flexuosa) and Nerine bowdenii. N. sarniensis is, probably, the best known species of the genus and it has been cultivated in Europe since the beginning of the 17th century. N. bowdenii was introduced to England at the end of the 19th century and used as an ornamental since the first decade of the 20th century. Along with Nerine bowdenii they have been extensively used in plant breeding programmes that have produced the majority of the commercially available hybrids. The hybrid cultivar 'Zeal Giant' has gained the Royal Horticultural Society's Award of Garden Merit.

The bulbs of Nerine species need a minimum of two years growth and development in order to produce their first flowers. The largest bulbs can give rise to two stems or more if they have been grown under suitable conditions. They are used as cut flowers as they can survive up to 14 days in a vase with water without showing any staining.

== Uses ==
Nerine species and hybrids with their colourful long-lasting blooms are grown commercially for the cut-flower industry and sale of ornamental bulbs.

== Gallery ==
Figure 2. Other species
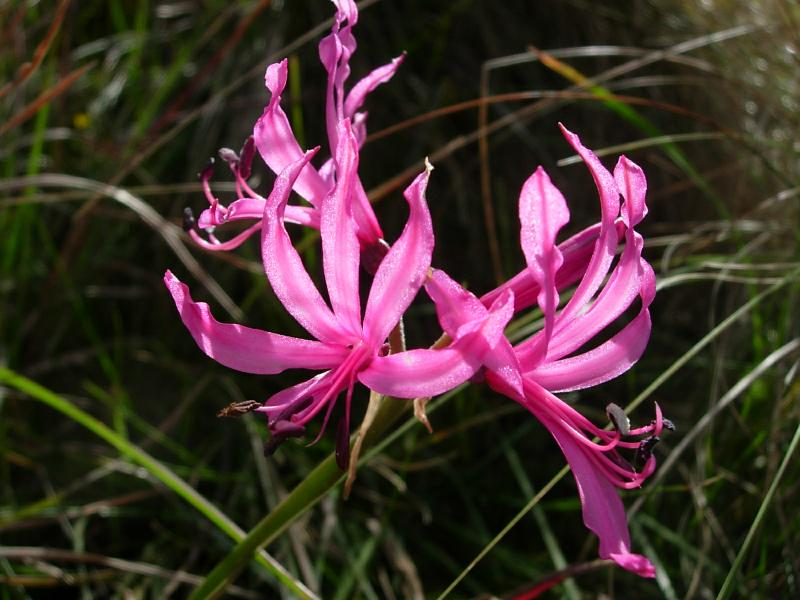
A. N. angulata

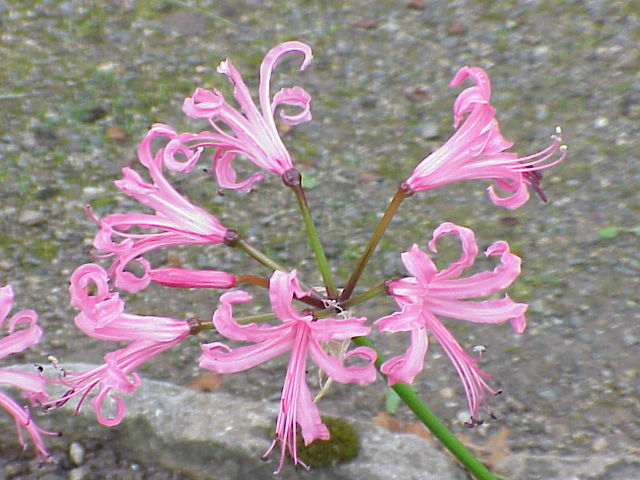
B. N. bowdwnii

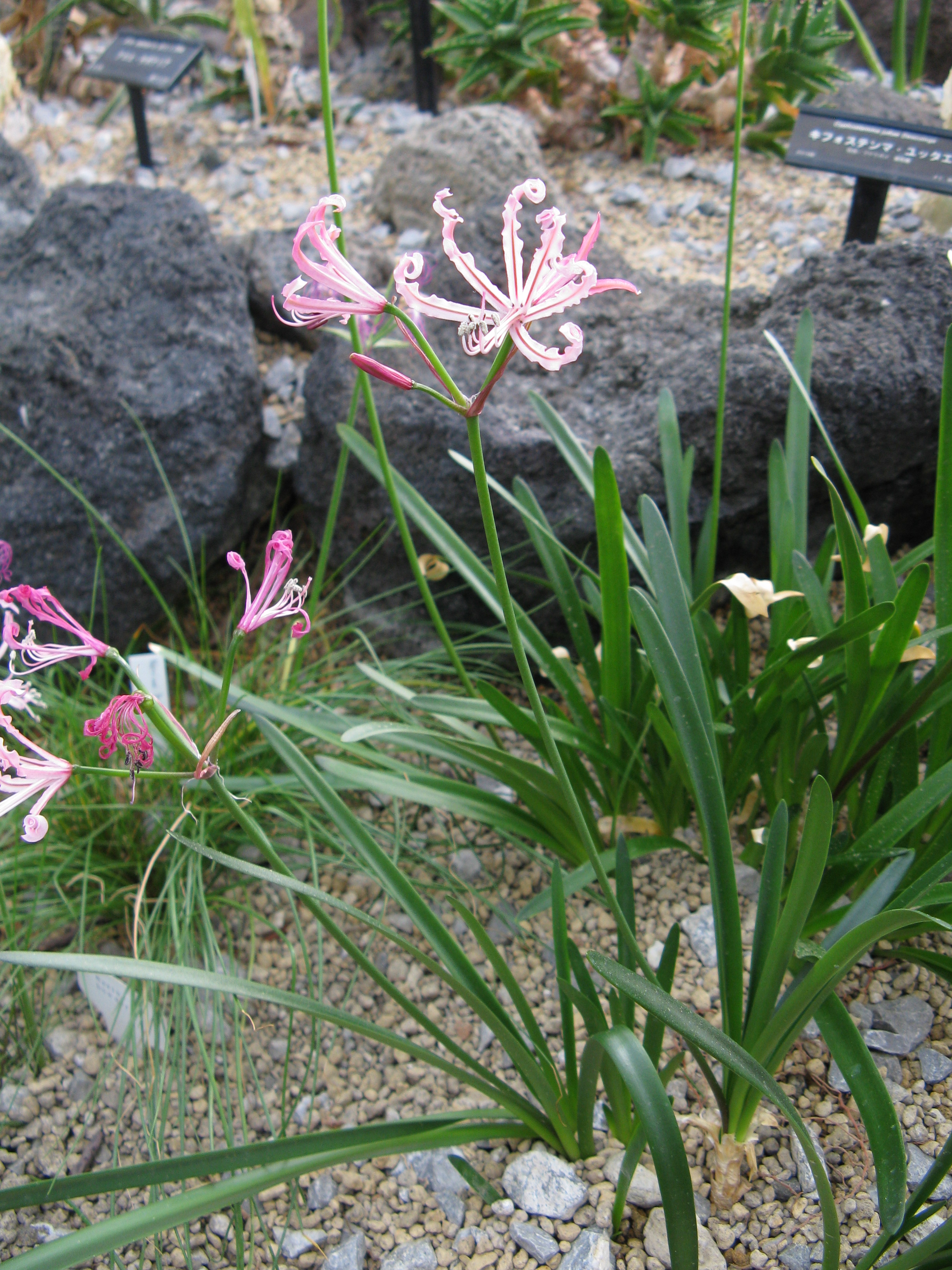
C. N. humilis

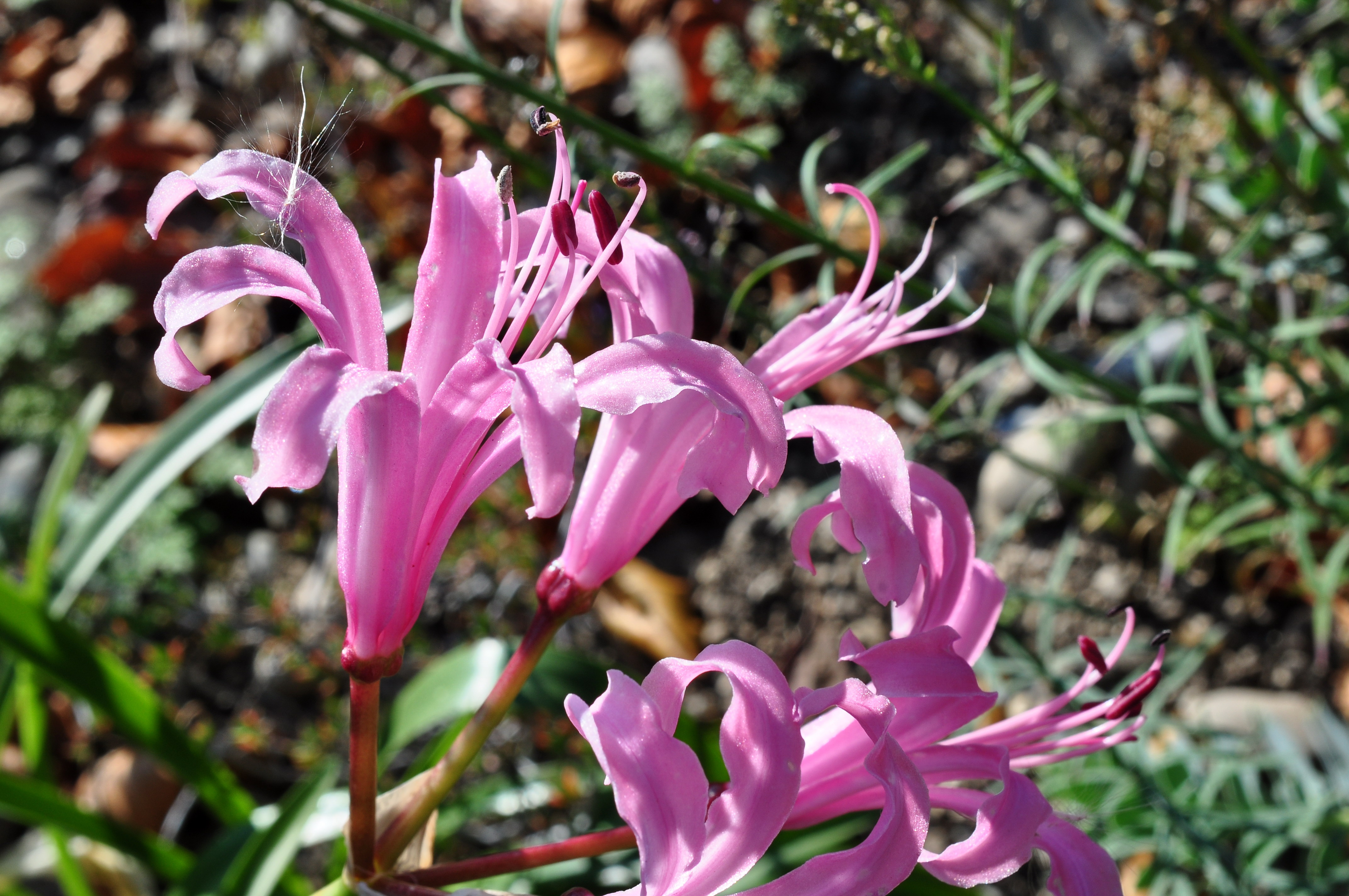
D. N. mansellii

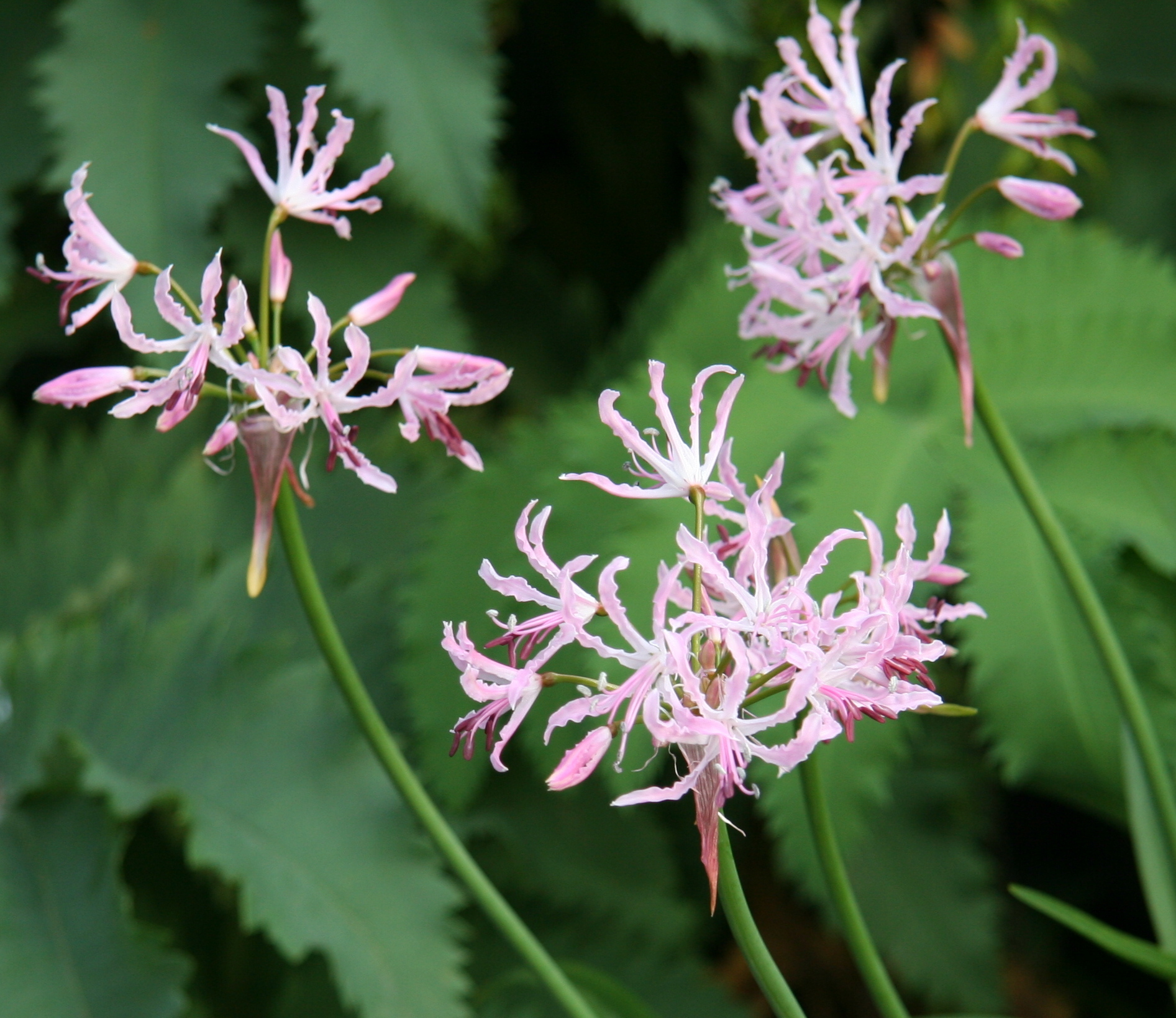
E. N. undulata

== See also ==
- Glossary of botanical terms
- Glossary of plant morphology

== Bibliography ==
=== Historical sources ===
- Douglas, James (2012) [1725, 2nd ed. 1727]. A Description of the Guernsey Lilly. Extraordinary Editions.
- Linnaeus, Carl (1753). Species Plantarum: exhibentes plantas rite cognitas, ad genera relatas, cum differentiis specificis, nominibus trivialibus, synonymis selectis, locis natalibus, secundum systema sexuale digestas. Stockholm: Impensis Laurentii Salvii. see also Species Plantarum
- Heister, Lorenz (1755). Beschreibung eines neuen Geschlechts von einer sehr raren und überaus schönen afrikanischen Pflanze aus der Familie der Zwiebelgewächse, welche er zu Ehren ... des ... Fürsten ... Karls ... zu Braunschweig und Lüneburg ... den Namen Brunsvigia beygelegt, wobey zugleich viele Irrthümer einiger Kräuterkenner angezeiget und verbessert werden, nebst drey ... Kupferplatten worauf obige Pflanze mit lebendigen Farben nach dem Leben dargestellet wird. Braunschweig: Waysenhause.
- Candolle, A. P. de (1813). Théorie élémentaire de la botanique, ou exposition des principes de la classification naturelle et de l'art de décrire et d'etudier les végétaux (in French).
- Herbert, William (1820). "Nerine rosea. Rose-coloured nerine". Curtis's Botanical Magazine. 47: t 2124.
- Herbert, W. (4 April 1820). "On the culture of the Guernsey Lily, and other bulbs of the genera Nerine, Coburgia and Brunsvigia, heretofore united under Amaryllis". Trans. Hortic. Soc. Lond. 4: 176–184.
- Herbert, William (1821). "An Appendix: Preliminary Treatise (pp. 1–14) and A Treatise &c. (pp. 15–52)". The Botanical Register. 7.
- Herbert, William (1837). Amaryllidaceae: Preceded by an Attempt to Arrange the Monocotyledonous Orders, and Followed by a Treatise on Cross-bred Vegetables, and Supplement. London: Ridgway.
- Baker, John Gilbert (1888). Handbook of the Amaryllideæ including the Alstrœmerieæ and Agaveæ. London: Bell.

=== Books ===
- Byng, James W. (2014). The Flowering Plants Handbook: A practical guide to families and genera of the world. Plant Gateway Ltd. ISBN 9780992999315.
- Coombes, Allen J. (2012). The A to Z of plant names. USA: Timber Press. p. 312. ISBN 9781604691962.
- Dahlgren, R.M.; Clifford, H.T.; Yeo, P.F. (1985). The families of the monocotyledons. Berlin: Springer-Verlag. ISBN 978-3-642-64903-5.
- Dimitri, M. (1987). Enciclopedia Argentina de Agricultura y Jardinería. Tomo I. Descripción de plantas cultivadas (in Spanish). Buenos Aires: Editorial ACME S.A.C.I.
- Duncan, Graham D (2002). Grow Nerines: a guide to the species, cultivation and propagation of the genus Nerine. Claremont, South Africa: National Botanical Institute, Kirstenbosch. ISBN 978-1919684338.
- Dyer, R. Allen (1975). The genera of Southern African flowering plants: Flora of southern Africa (3d ed.). Pretoria: Dept. of Agricultural Technical Services. ISBN 9780621028546.
- Glen, H.F. (2002). Cultivated plants of southern Africa : botanical names, common names, origins, literature. Johannesburg: Jacana. ISBN 9781919931173.
- Kubitzki, K., ed. (1998). The families and genera of vascular plants. Vol.3. Berlin, Germany: Springer-Verlag. ISBN 978-3-540-64060-8.
- RHS (2008). RHS A-Z encyclopedia of garden plants. United Kingdom: Dorling Kindersley. p. 1136. ISBN 978-1405332965.
- Sunset Western Garden Book (6th ed.). Menlo Park, Calif.: Sunset Pub. Corp. 1995. pp. 606–607. ISBN 978-0376038517.

=== Articles, symposia and theses ===
- APG IV (2016). "An update of the Angiosperm Phylogeny Group classification for the orders and families of flowering plants: APG IV". Botanical Journal of the Linnean Society. 181 (1): 1–20. doi:10.1111/boj.12385.
- Brown, Natalie Ruth (October 1999). The Reproductive Biology of Nerine (Amaryllidaceae) (PhD) (Thesis). University of Tasmania.
  - Volume 1/2
  - Volume 2/2
- David, John. "The Nerine bowdenii story" (PDF). pp. 31–41., in RHS (2008a)
- David, John (2012). "James Douglas's A Description of the Guernsey Lilly with a modern Commentary and bibliography by Dr Helen Brock" (Book review)., in NAAS (2016)
- Duncan, Graham D. (2002). "The genus Nerine". Bulbs. 4 (1): 9–15.
- Duncan, Graham D. "The distribution, habitat and conservation status of the species of Nerine" (PDF). pp. 22–31., in RHS (2008a)
- Germishuizen, G, ed. (June 2009). "Flowering Plants of Africa" (PDF). 61. Pretoria, RSA: SANBI. Archived from the original (PDF) on 2017-05-10. (see also Flowering Plants of Africa)
- Goldblatt, Peter (1972). "Chromosome cytology in relation to classification in Nerine and Brunsvigia (Amaryllidaceae)". J. S. Afr. Bot. 38: 261–275.
- Meerow, Alan W.; Snijman, Deirdre A. (December 2001). "Phylogeny of Amaryllidaceae Tribe Amaryllideae Based on nrDNA ITS Sequences and Morphology". American Journal of Botany. 88 (12): 2321–2330. Bibcode:2001AmJB...88.2321M. doi:10.2307/3558392. JSTOR 3558392. PMID 21669663.
- Norris, C.A. (1974). "The genus Nerine". Bull. of the Nerine Soc. Part II. 6: 7–31.
- Snijman, D. A.; Linder, H. P. (1996). "Phylogenetic Relationships, Seed Characters, and Dispersal System Evolution in Amaryllideae (Amaryllidaceae)". Annals of the Missouri Botanical Garden. 83 (3): 362–386. Bibcode:1996AnMBG..83..362S. doi:10.2307/2399866. JSTOR 2399866.
- Traub, H. P. (1967). "Review of the genus Nerine Herb". Plant Life. 23: Sup. 3–32.
- Zonneveld, B. J. M.; Duncan, G. D. (March 2006). "Genome size for the species of Nerine Herb. (Amaryllidaceae) and its evident correlation with growth cycle, leaf width and other morphological characters". Plant Systematics and Evolution. 257 (3–4): 251–260. Bibcode:2006PSyEv.257..251Z. doi:10.1007/s00606-005-0381-x. S2CID 31666264.
- RHS (2008a). "Report of the Proceedings of a Hardy Nerine Study Day" (PDF). RHS Herbaceous Plant Committee and the Nerine & Amaryllid Society.

=== Species ===
- Duncan, Graham D. (September 2014). "792. Nerine bowdenii subsp. wellsii". Curtis's Botanical Magazine. 31 (3): 223–237. doi:10.1111/curt.12076.
- Dold, Tony; McMaster, Cameron (2004). "Nerine gibsonii" (PDF). Veld & Flora. 90 (3): 102–105.
- Duncan, Graham D. (November 2009). "648. Nerine humilis". Curtis's Botanical Magazine. 26 (3): 200–209. doi:10.1111/j.1467-8748.2009.01650.x.
- Duncan, Graham (June 2016). "830. Nerine laticoma subsp. huttoniae". Curtis's Botanical Magazine. 33 (2): 114–124. doi:10.1111/curt.12139.
- Dold, Tony; Cloete, Elize; Weeks, Dez (2000). "The nerine from Misty Mount: The conservation status of Nerine masoniorum in the Eastern Cape". Veld & Flora. 86 (4): 168–169. hdl:10520/AJA00423203_2903.
- Duncan, Graham D.; Craib, C.L.; Condy, G. (June 2009). "2245. Nerine pancratioides" (PDF). Flowering Plants of Africa. 61: 34–41. Archived from the original (PDF) on 2017-05-10.
- Craib, C.L. (1996). "Nerine platypetala: habitat studies and cultivation". Herbertia. 51: 68–73.
- Duncan, Graham D. (September 2005). "533. Nerine pusilla". Curtis's Botanical Magazine. 22 (3): 169–175. doi:10.1111/j.1355-4905.2005.00485.x.

=== Websites ===
- Titchmarsh, Alan (11 October 2014). "October stunner: Alan Titchmarsh's tips for growing nerines in your garden". Daily Express.
- "PlantZAfrica". SANBI.
- TPL (September 2013). "The Plant List: a working list of all known plant species. Version: 1.1". Royal Botanic Gardens, Kew and Missouri Botanical Garden.
- Dressler, S.; Schmidt, M. & Zizka, G. (2014). "Nerine". African plants – a Photo Guide. Frankfurt/Main: Forschungsinstitut Senckenberg.

==== Organizations ====
- IBS (2013). "International Bulb Society". Archived from the original on 13 August 2013.
  - Saunders, Rachel; Saunders, Rod. "Nerines In South Africa: A Primer". Archived from the original on 21 September 2013., in IBS (2013)
- MBG. "Missouri Botanical Garden".
  - Stevens, P.F. (2016) [2001], Angiosperm Phylogeny Website, Missouri Botanical Garden
- NAAS. "The Nerine and Amaryllid Society". Founded 1997, previously Nerine Society, founded 1966.
- "Pacific Bulb Society Wiki". Pacific Bulb Society. 2016.
  - "Nerine"., in PBS (2016)
- RBG. "Royal Botanic Gardens Kew". Board of Trustees of the Royal Botanic Gardens, Kew.
  - "World Checklist of Selected Plant Families". The Board of Trustees of the Royal Botanic Gardens, Kew.
- RHS (2015). "Royal Horticultural Society".
