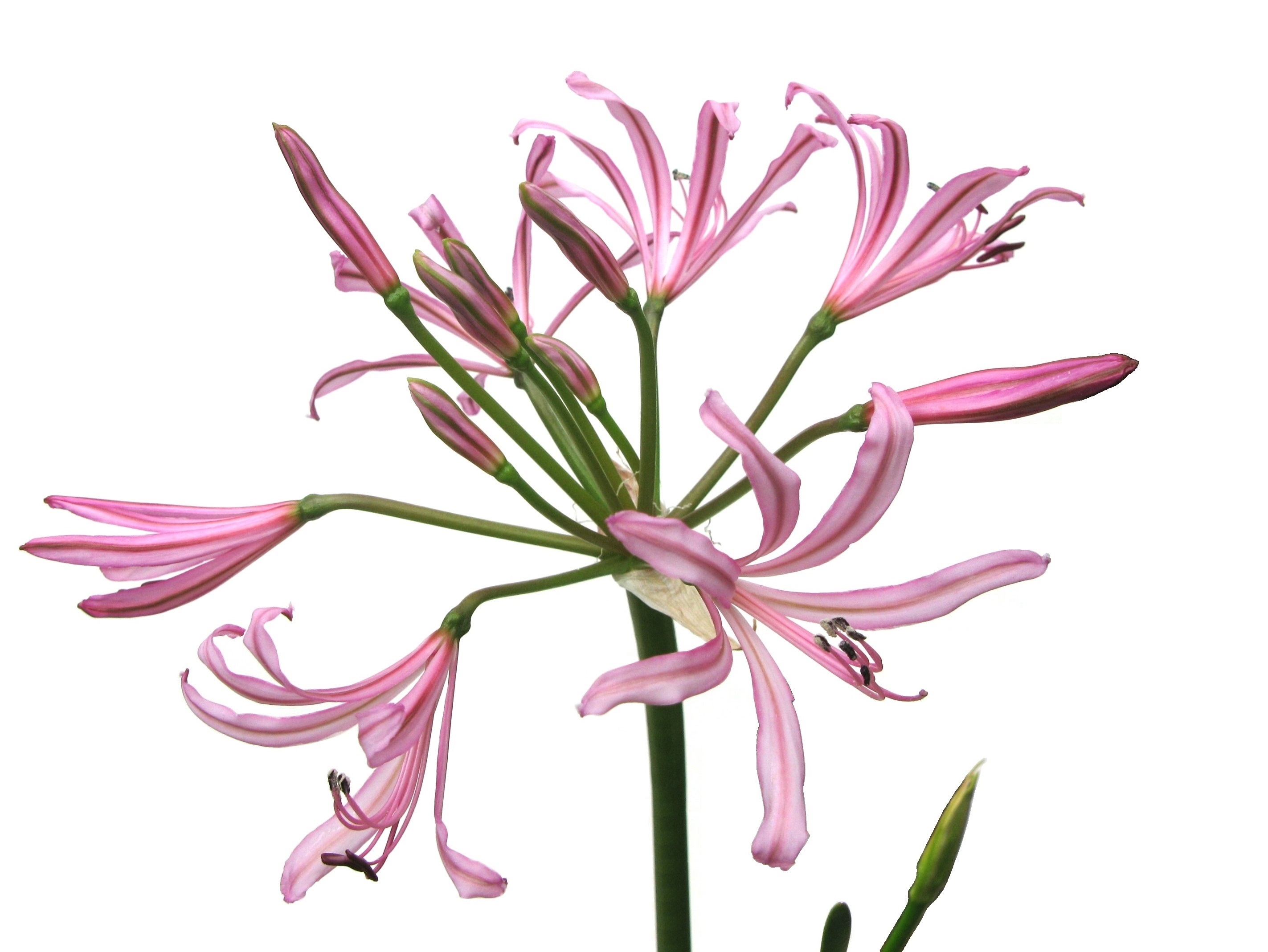
- umbel inflorescence on scape

Scientific classification
- Kingdom: Plantae
- Clade: Tracheophytes
- Clade: Angiosperms
- Clade: Monocots
- Order: Asparagales
- Family: Amaryllidaceae
- Subfamily: Amaryllidoideae
- Genus: Nerine
- Species: N. krigei

Binomial name
- Nerine krigei W.F.Barker

= Nerine krigei =

Species of flowering plant

Nerine krigei, commonly known as the corkscrew nerine or curly leaved nerine, is a bulb native to Gauteng and Mpumalanga provinces in South Africa.

== Gallery ==
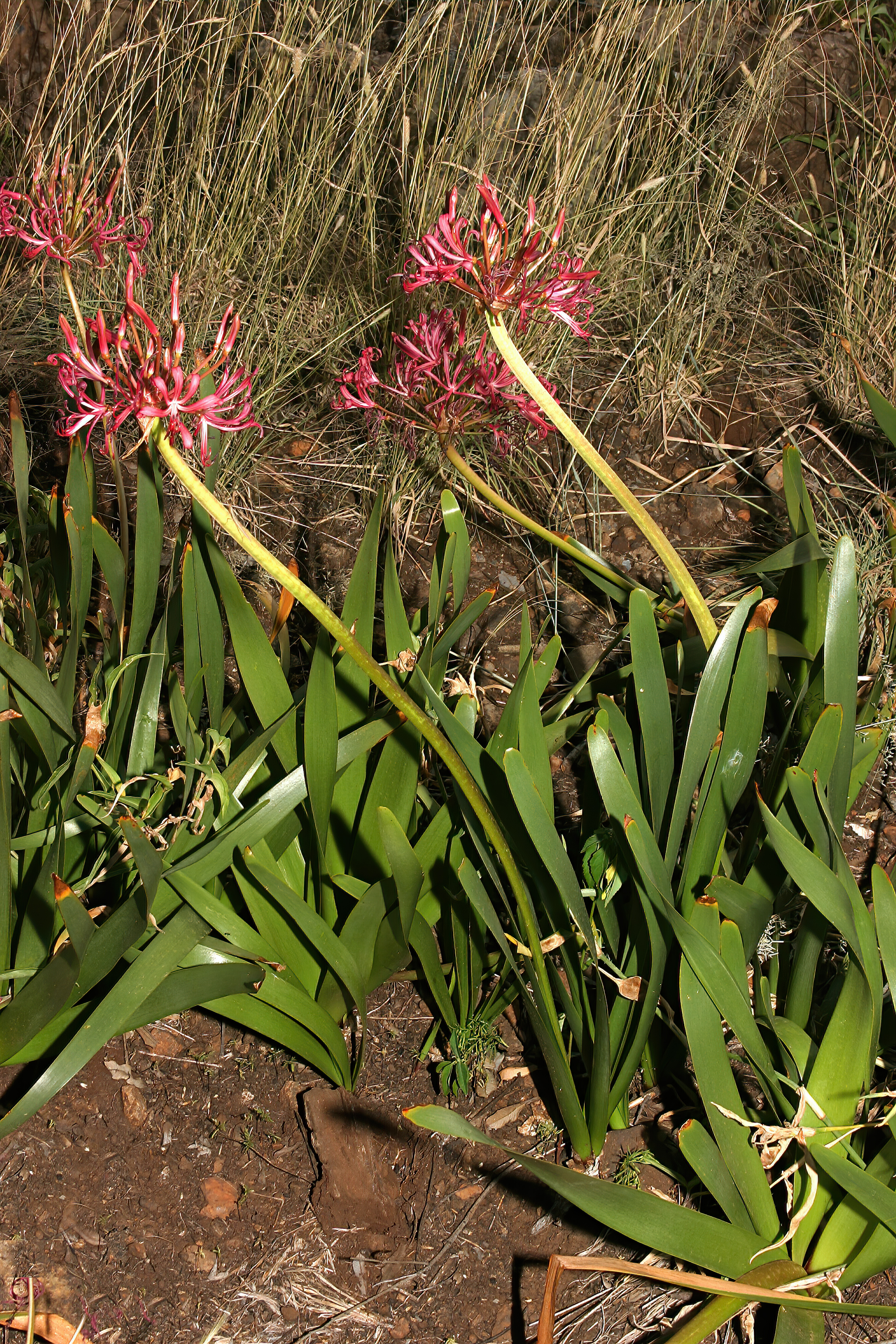
Habit at Broederstroom, Gauteng

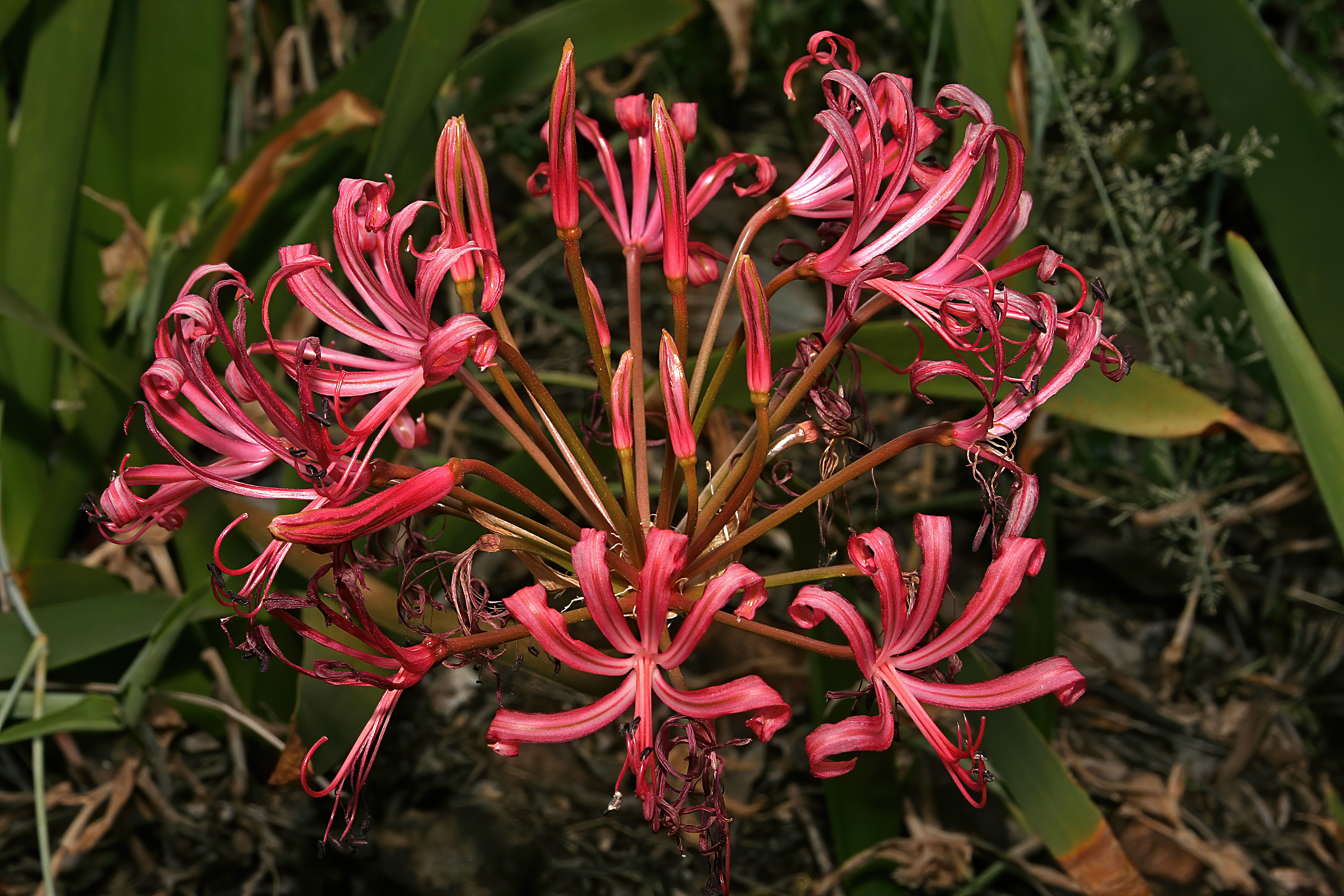
Inflorescence during late summer at Broederstroom, Gauteng

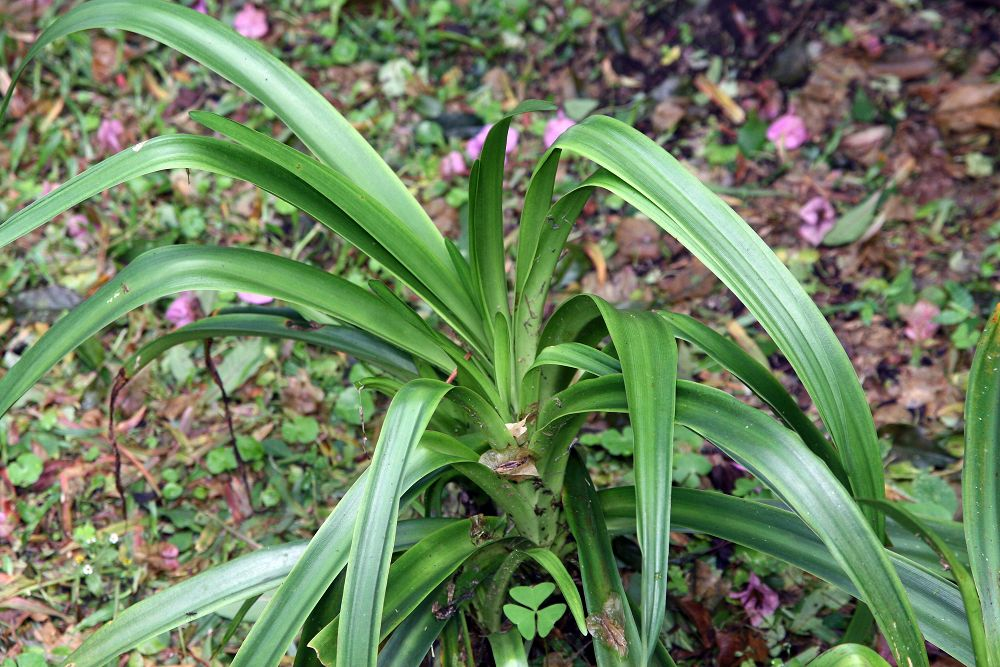
Foliage of a cultivated plant
