= Athelstan Cornish-Bowden =

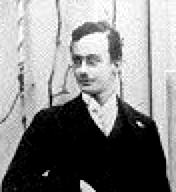
- Athelstan Hall Cornish-Bowden in about 1885
- Born: 4 December 1871; Newton Abbot, Devon, England
- Died: 4 December 1942 (aged 71); Somerset West, Cape Province, South Africa
- Occupation: Land surveyor

Athelstan Hall Cornish-Bowden (1871–1942) was a British land surveyor in South Africa.

== Life ==
Cornish-Bowden was the seventh of the 12 children of Admiral William Bowden and Elizabeth Anne Cornish. He attended St. Andrew's College, Grahamstown where he studied in the land survey department, he passed the Survey Certificate examination of the University of the Cape of Good Hope in 1894. In 1896 he passed the survey examination set by the surveyor-general's office and was admitted to practice as a government land surveyor in the Cape Colony. In January 1903 he was appointed second assistant surveyor-general. He became acting surveyor-general in December 1904, following the death of surveyor-general C.H.L. Max Jurisch, and was appointed surveyor-general of the colony on 1 January 1906.

Cornish-Bowden was president of the Institute of Government Land Surveyors of the Cape of Good Hope from 1905 to 1909. He became a member of the British Association for the Advancement of Science in 1905 and at the joint meeting of that association and its South African counterpart held in South Africa in 1905 was one of the secretaries of the British Association's Section E (Geography). That same year he became a member of the South African Philosophical Society and remained a member for some time after it became the Royal Society of South Africa in 1908.

== Publications ==
- Soldiers' graves in Cape Colony: Anglo-Boer war, 1899-1902. Cape Town: Government of the Cape Colony. 1907. p. 83. OCLC 36951732.
- "Site planning". South African Survey Journal. 1 (6): 312–314. 1925.

== Legacy ==
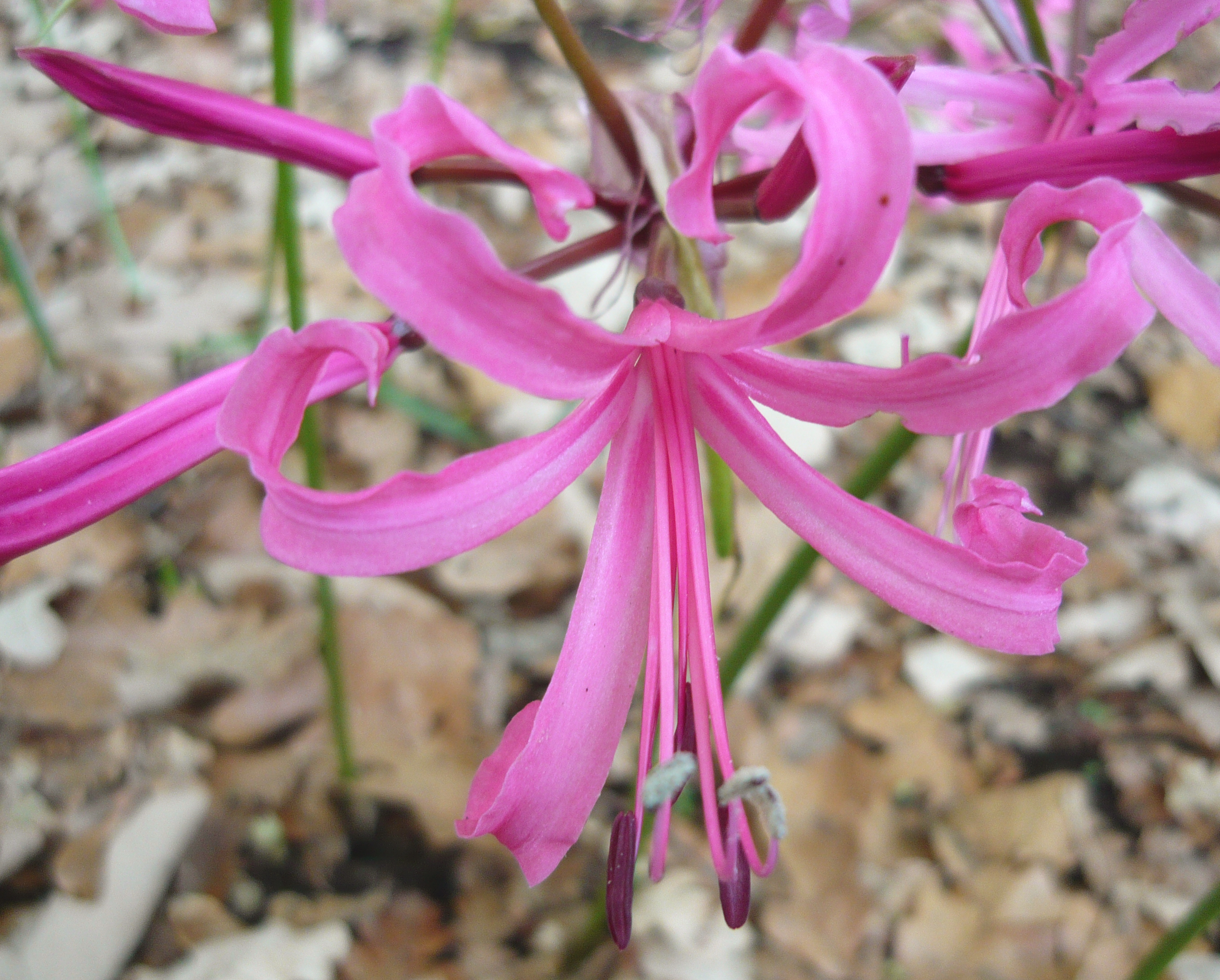
Nerine bowdenii

Before or in 1899 Cornish-Bowden sent some flower bulbs he found in South Africa to his mother in Newton Abbot, Devon, England. In 1902, she sent flowers and bulbs from the plant to Kew Herbarium with a note requesting that the species be named after her son. After some confusion, the species was named Nerine bowdenii.

== Family ==
He married Lillie Cameron Muir, daughter of Sir Thomas Muir (1844-1934), mathematician and educator. They had one son, (Athelstan) Claude Muir Cornish-Bowden. The biochemist Athel Cornish-Bowden is his great-nephew.
