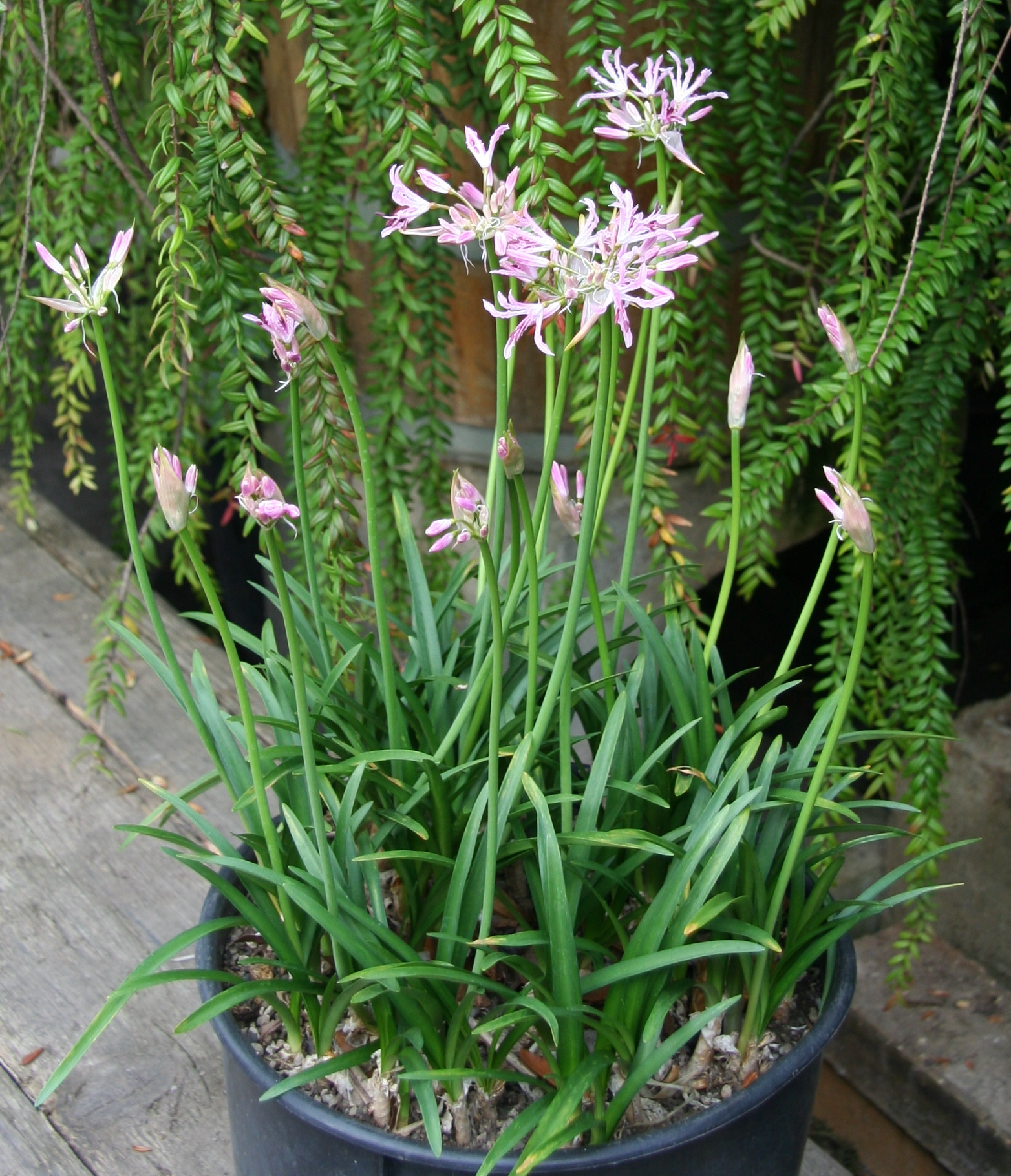

Scientific classification
- Kingdom: Plantae
- Clade: Tracheophytes
- Clade: Angiosperms
- Clade: Monocots
- Order: Asparagales
- Family: Amaryllidaceae
- Subfamily: Amaryllidoideae
- Genus: Nerine
- Species: N. undulata

Binomial name
- Nerine undulata (L.) Herb., 1820

= Nerine undulata =

Species of flowering plant

Nerine undulata syn. N. crispa is a species of flowering plant in the subfamily Amaryllidoideae of the family Amaryllidaceae, that is native to the eastern Cape of South Africa. Growing to 45 cm (18 in) tall, it is a bulbous perennial with narrow grasslike leaves that are almost evergreen, and umbels of 8-12 slender, crinkled pale pink or mid-pink flowers 5 cm across in autumn.

The Latin specific epithet undulata means "wavy, undulating", in reference to the crinkled tepals of the flowers.

A white-flowered cultivar, N. undulata (Flexuosa Group) 'Alba', has been given the Royal Horticultural Society's Award of Garden Merit. It is hardy in mild or coastal areas of the UK, but requires a sunny, sheltered spot.
