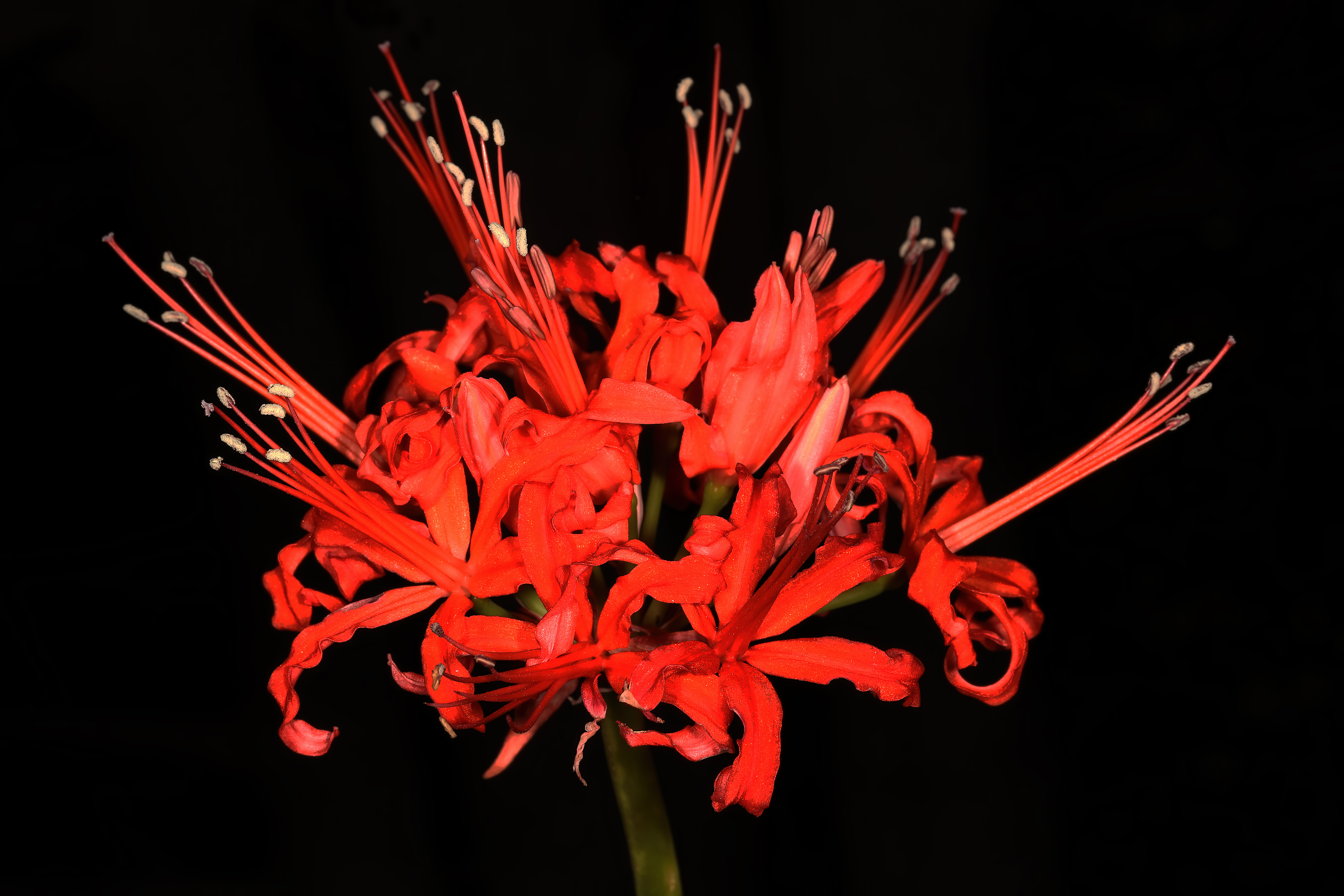
- Nerine sarniensis bloom

Scientific classification
- Kingdom: Plantae
- Clade: Tracheophytes
- Clade: Angiosperms
- Clade: Monocots
- Order: Asparagales
- Family: Amaryllidaceae
- Subfamily: Amaryllidoideae
- Genus: Nerine
- Species: N. sarniensis

Binomial name
- Nerine sarniensis Herb.

Synonyms
- Nerine rosea Herb.

= Nerine sarniensis =

Species of flowering plant

Nerine sarniensis, commonly known as Guernsey lily or Raquel is a species of flowering plant in the family Amaryllidaceae. It is the type species of the Nerine genus. It is widely cultivated in the temperate world and is particularly associated with the island of Guernsey, as reflected in both its Latin and common names (sarniensis means "from Guernsey"), though it does not originate there, nor is it a true lily (it is more closely related to Amaryllis and Sternbergia). It is native to the Northern and Western Cape Provinces of South Africa, though it is now naturalized in France, Madeira and the Azores.

Nerine sarniensis is a bulbous perennial growing to 45 cm (18 in) tall by 8 cm (3 in) wide, with strap-shaped leaves and umbels of scarlet, lily-like flowers with conspicuous stamens tipped with purple anthers, in late summer and early autumn.

In cultivation N. sarniensis requires winter protection in colder areas. Nerine lily is known among florists as one of the longest lasting cut flowers.

== See also ==
- List of plants known as lily

== Bibliography ==
- Pink, A. (2004). Gardening for the Million. Project Gutenberg Literary Archive Foundation.
