= Speckled Wood =

Speckled Wood may refer to:

== Species ==
- Speckled wood (butterfly) (Pararge aegeria), a species of butterfly found throughout the Palearctic realm
- Madeiran speckled wood (Pararge xiphia), a species of butterfly found on the island of Madeira
- Canary speckled wood (Pararge xiphioides), a species of butterfly found on the Canary Islands
- Speckled wood pigeon (Columba hodgsonii), a species of bird found in Asia
- Speckled wood-lily (Clintonia umbellulata), a species of flowering plant native to the eastern United States

== Places ==
- Speckled Wood, Hastings, a woodland area in East Sussex, United Kingdom
