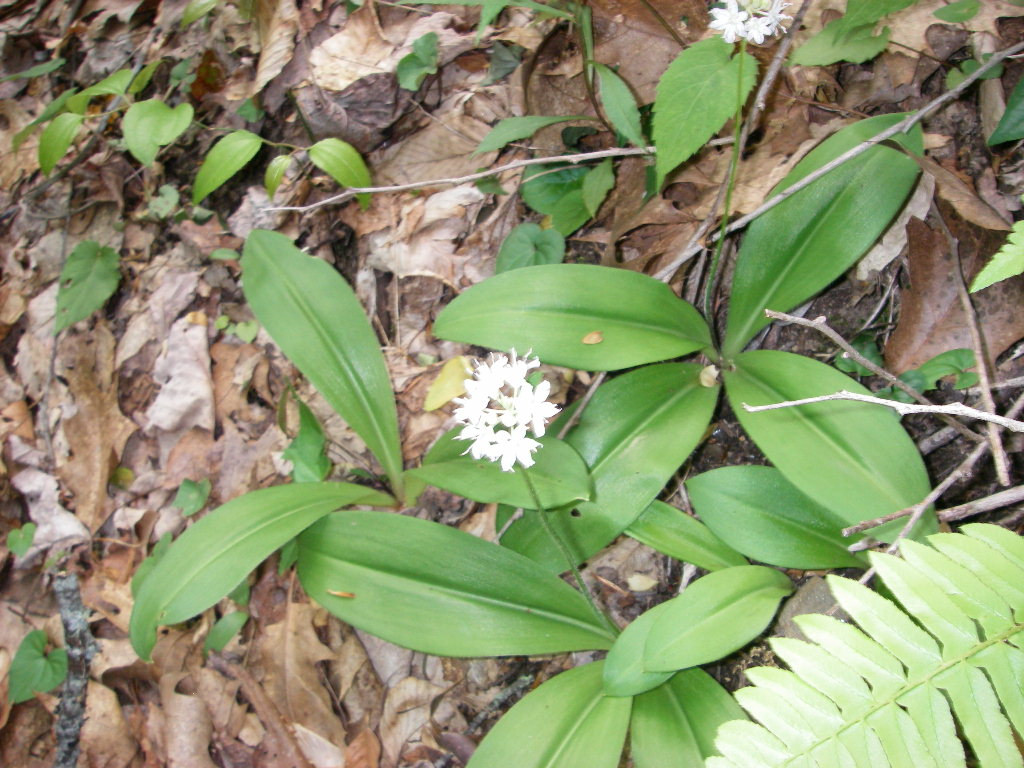

Conservation status
- Secure (NatureServe)

Scientific classification
- Kingdom: Plantae
- Clade: Tracheophytes
- Clade: Angiosperms
- Clade: Monocots
- Order: Liliales
- Family: Liliaceae
- Subfamily: Lilioideae
- Genus: Clintonia
- Species: C. umbellulata

Binomial name
- Clintonia umbellulata (Michx.) Morong

Synonyms
- Synonymy: Clintonia alleghaniensis Harned; Clintonia decantha Raf.; Clintonia multiflora Beck; Clintonia odorata Raf.; Clintonia odorata var. punctata Raf.; Clintonia parviflora Raf.; Clintonia parviflora var. abortiva Raf.; Clintonia parviflora var. plicata Raf.; Clintonia podanisia Raf.; Clintonia podanisia var. biflora Raf.; Clintonia podanisia var. fascicularis Raf.; Clintonia podanisia var. glabrata Raf.; Clintonia podanisia var. phyllostema Raf.; Clintonia podanisia var. phyllostema Raf.; Clintonia umbellata Torr.; Convallaria umbellulata Michx.; Xeniatrum umbellatum (Torr.) Salisb.; Xeniatrum umbellulatum (Michx.) Small

= Clintonia umbellulata =

Species of flowering plant in the lily family

Clintonia umbellulata, commonly known as white clintonia or speckled wood-lily, is a species of flowering plant in the lily family Liliaceae. The specific epithet umbellulata means "umbelled," which refers to the shape of the plant’s inflorescence.

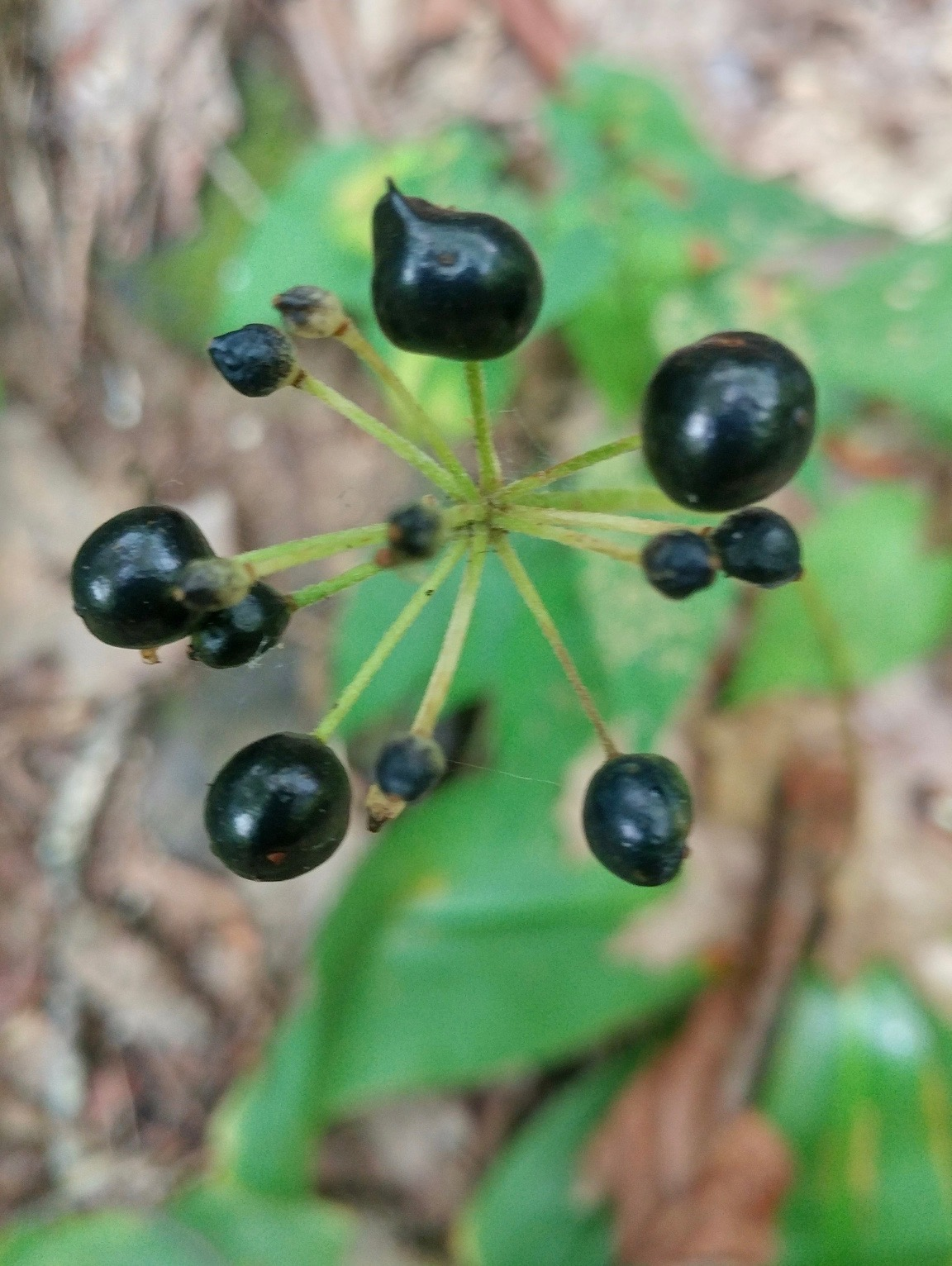
The ripe fruits are black berries (Virginia, USA, September 2017)

== Description ==
Clintonia umbellulata is a perennial herbaceous plant that spreads by means of underground rhizomes. A plant stands 27 to 60 cm (11 to 24 in) tall with 2–4 dark green leaves, each 18 to 30 cm (7 to 12 in) long and 4.5 to 8 cm (2 to 3 in) wide. The inflorescence is a single terminal umbel with 10–25(–30) outward-facing flowers on a flowering stalk up to 50 cm (20 in) high. Each flower has six tepals and six stamens. The tepals are white or greenish white, often marked with purplish brown or green speckles, each tepal being 5.5 to 8 mm (0.2 to 0.3 in) long and 2.7 to 4 mm (0.1 to 0.2 in) wide. The stamens are 60% longer than the tepals. The fruits are black (occasionally ultramarine blue) berries, each 6 to 8 mm (0.2 to 0.3 in) long with 2–4 seeds per berry. Each seed is approximately 3.5 mm (0.1 in) long.

=== Similar species ===
Because of their proximity, Clintonia umbellulata and C. borealis are often confused. The following table compares the two species character by character (with diagnostic characters emphasized):

	Clintonia umbellulata	Clintonia borealis
Habitat	Hardwood forests less than 1,000 m (3,281 ft)	Mixed forests up to 1,600 m (5,249 ft)
Height	Plant stands 27 to 60 cm (11 to 24 in) tall	Plant stands 20 to 50 cm (8 to 20 in) tall
Leaves	Leaves 3–4, blade dark green, each leaf 18 to 30 cm (7 to 12 in) long and 4.5 to 8 cm (2 to 3 in) wide	Leaves 2–4, blade dark glossy green, each leaf 15 to 30 cm (6 to 12 in) long and 5 to 10 cm (2 to 4 in) wide
Flower buds	A tight cluster of spherical buds	A loose cluster of elongate buds
Inflorescence	Terminal umbel, 10–25(–30) outward-facing flowers	Terminal raceme, 3–8(–10) nodding flowers
Flowers	Tepals white or greenish white, often marked with purplish brown or green speckles, each tepal 5.5 to 8 mm (0.2 to 0.3 in) long and 2.7 to 4 mm (0.1 to 0.2 in) wide; filaments 5.5 to 7 mm (0.2 to 0.3 in) long; anthers approximately 4.5 mm (0.2 in) long	Tepals yellow or yellowish green, each tepal 12 to 16 mm (0.5 to 0.6 in) long and 3.5 to 4.5 mm (0.1 to 0.2 in) wide; filaments 12 to 17.5 mm (0.5 to 0.7 in) long; anthers approximately 3 mm (0.1 in) long
Fruits	Berries black (occasionally ultramarine blue), globose to ellipsoid, each berry 6 to 8 mm (0.2 to 0.3 in) long; seeds 2–4 per berry, each seed approximately 3.5 mm (0.1 in) long	Berries ultramarine blue (rarely white), ovoid, each berry 8 to 12 mm (0.3 to 0.5 in) long; seeds 8–16 per berry, each seed approximately 4 mm (0.2 in) long

Based on morphological characters alone, bare-leaved plants may be difficult to identify. In this case, Clintonia umbellulata is distinguished from C. borealis by the presence of hairs longer than 1 millimeter on the underside midvein.

C. umbellulata has numerous look-alikes. For example, the inflorescence of the small white leek (Allium tricoccum) is very similar in appearance. To distinguish the two, look at the leaves. The leaves of A. tricoccum have usually wilted by the time the plant is in full bloom while the leaves of C. umbellulata remain throughout the summer months.

== Taxonomy ==
In 1803, André Michaux described the species Convallaria umbellulata Michx., a name that was to become a synonym for Clintonia umbellulata (Michx.) Morong. The latter was first described by Thomas Morong in 1894.

In 1933, John Kunkel Small described the segregate species Xeniatrum umbellulatum, a distinction that did not persist. Numerous other synonyms are in use. Perhaps the best known is Clintonia alleghaniensis Harned, which unlike C. umbellulata has ultramarine blue (not black) fruit. It is known to occur at a number of sites in Virginia, Maryland, and West Virginia.

== Distribution ==
Clintonia umbellulata is endemic to the Appalachian Mountains in the eastern United States, from New York to Georgia. Counties where the species is known to occur are listed below:

- New York: **Allegany**, **Cattaraugus**, **Chautauqua**, **Erie**, **Livingston**, Wyoming
- Ohio: Ashland, **Ashtabula**, Columbiana, Coshocton, Harrison, Holmes, Jefferson, Mahoning, Portage, Summit, Trumbull, Tuscarawas, Wayne
- Pennsylvania: Allegheny, **Armstrong**, Beaver, **Bedford**, **Blair**, **Butler**, **Cambria**, **Centre**, **Clarion**, **Clearfield**, **Crawford**, **Elk**, **Erie**, **Fayette**, **Forest**, **Franklin**, **Fulton**, Greene, Huntingdon, Indiana, **Jefferson**, Lawrence, **Mercer**, **Somerset**, **Venango**, **Warren**, Washington, **Westmoreland**
- Maryland: Allegany, **Garrett**
- West Virginia: Barbour, Braxton, Fayette, **Grant**, **Greenbrier**, Hampshire, Hardy, Kanawha, Lincoln, Logan, Marion, McDowell, **Mercer**, Mineral, Mingo, Monongalia, Monroe, Morgan, **Nicholas**, **Pocahontas**, **Preston**, **Randolph**, Ritchie, Summers, **Tucker**, Upshur, Wayne, Webster, Wetzel, Wyoming
- Virginia: Albemarle, **Alleghany**, **Amherst**, **Augusta**, **Bath**, **Bedford**, **Bland**, **Botetourt**, Buchanan, Carroll, Craig, Dickenson, Floyd, Franklin, **Giles**, **Grayson**, **Greene**, Henry, **Highland**, Lee, **Madison**, Montgomery, **Nelson**, **Page**, Patrick, Pulaski, **Rappahannock**, Roanoke, **Rockbridge**, **Rockingham**, **Russell**, Scott, **Smyth**, **Tazewell**, **Warren**, **Washington**, Wise, Wythe
- Kentucky: Bell, Breathitt, Clay, Harlan, Jackson, Laurel, Lee, Letcher, Menifee, Morgan, Perry, Powell, Rockcastle, Rowan, Wolf
- Tennessee: Blount, Campbell, **Carter**, **Cocke**, Cumberland, **Greene**, Hawkins, **Johnson**, **Monroe**, Morgan, Polk, Rhea, Sequatchie, **Sevier**, Sullivan, **Unicoi**
- North Carolina: Alleghany, Ashe, **Avery**, **Buncombe**, Burke, **Caldwell**, Clay, **Graham**, **Haywood**, Henderson, **Jackson**, **Macon**, Madison, **McDowell**, **Mitchell**, Polk, Rutherford, Surry, **Swain**, **Transylvania**, **Watauga**, Wilkes, **Yancey**
- South Carolina: Greenville, **Oconee**, Pickens
- Georgia: Gilmer, Habersham, Lumpkin, Murray, Rabun, **Towns**, **Union**, White

The range of C. umbellulata apparently overlaps with that of C. borealis throughout the Appalachian Mountains. (Counties where both species are known to occur are shown above in bold.) Actually C. umbellulata and C. borealis are allopatric, that is, the ranges of the two species do not significantly overlap but are immediately adjacent to one another.

C. umbellulata is globally secure, rare and imperiled in New York, and endangered in Ohio.

== See also ==
- Speckled Wood (disambiguation)
