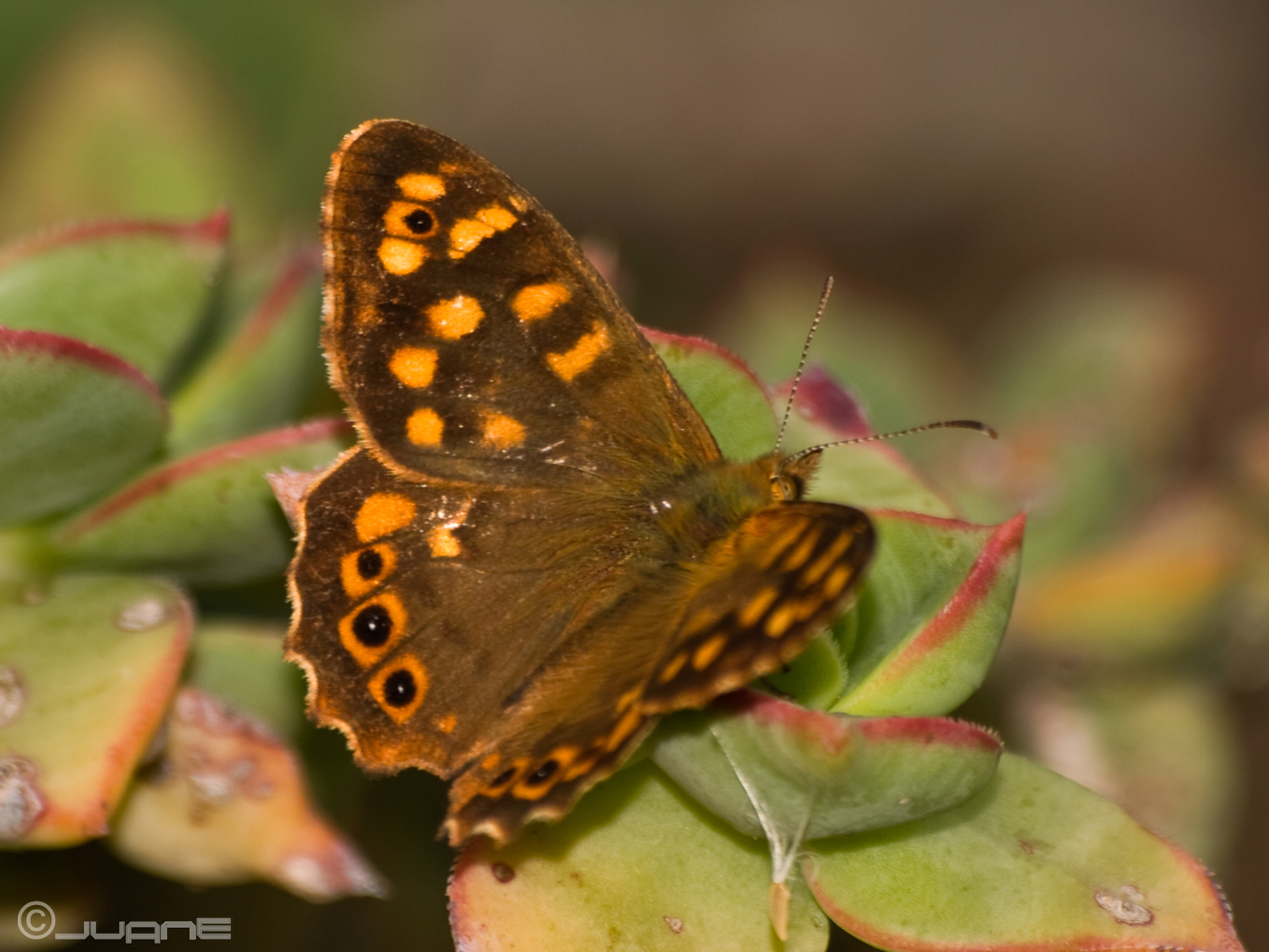
- Pararge xiphioides

Scientific classification
- Domain: Eukaryota
- Kingdom: Animalia
- Phylum: Arthropoda
- Class: Insecta
- Order: Lepidoptera
- Family: Nymphalidae
- Subtribe: Parargina
- Genus: Pararge; Hübner, [1819]

= Pararge =

Genus of insects

Pararge is a genus of butterflies of the family Nymphalidae.

== Species ==
- Pararge aegeria – speckled wood (Linnaeus, 1758)
- Pararge xiphia – Madeiran speckled wood (Fabricius, 1775)
- Pararge xiphioides – Canary speckled wood Staudinger, 1871
