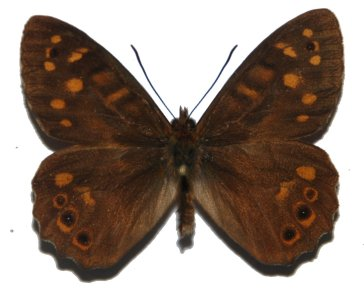

Conservation status
- Endangered (IUCN 3.1)

Scientific classification
- Kingdom: Animalia
- Phylum: Arthropoda
- Class: Insecta
- Order: Lepidoptera
- Family: Nymphalidae
- Genus: Pararge
- Species: P. xiphia

Binomial name
- Pararge xiphia (Fabricius, 1775)

Synonyms
- Papilio xiphia Fabricius, 1775

= Pararge xiphia =

Species of butterfly

Pararge xiphia, the Madeiran speckled wood, is a butterfly of the family Nymphalidae. It is found on the island of Madeira. It is considered as endangered due to competition from a related butterfly Pararge aegeria.

The wingspan is 50–60 millimetres (2.0–2.4 in). Adults are on the wing year round.

The larvae feed on various plants, including Brachypodium sylvaticum, Holcus lanatus and Agrostis gigantea.
