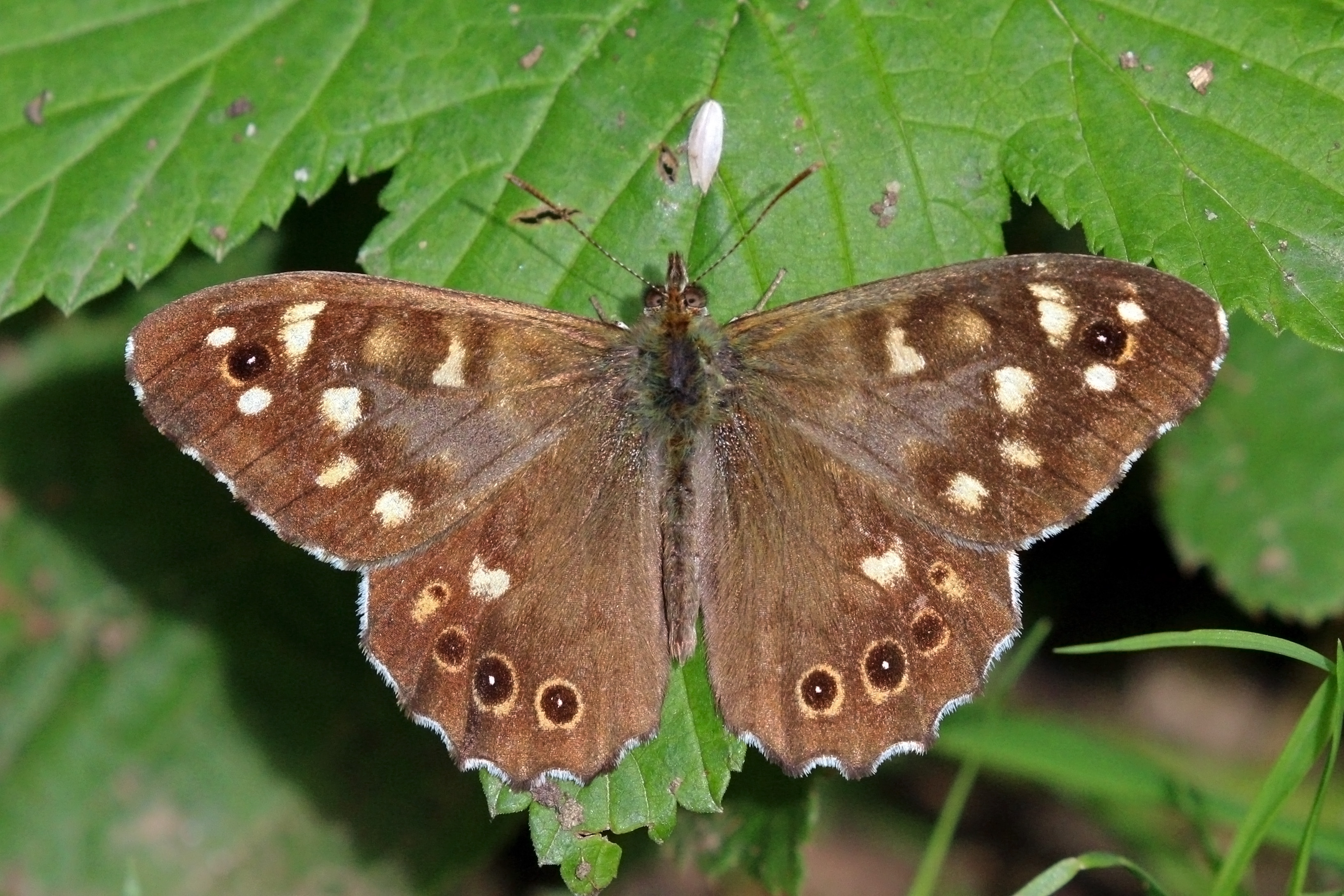
- Male P. a. tircis
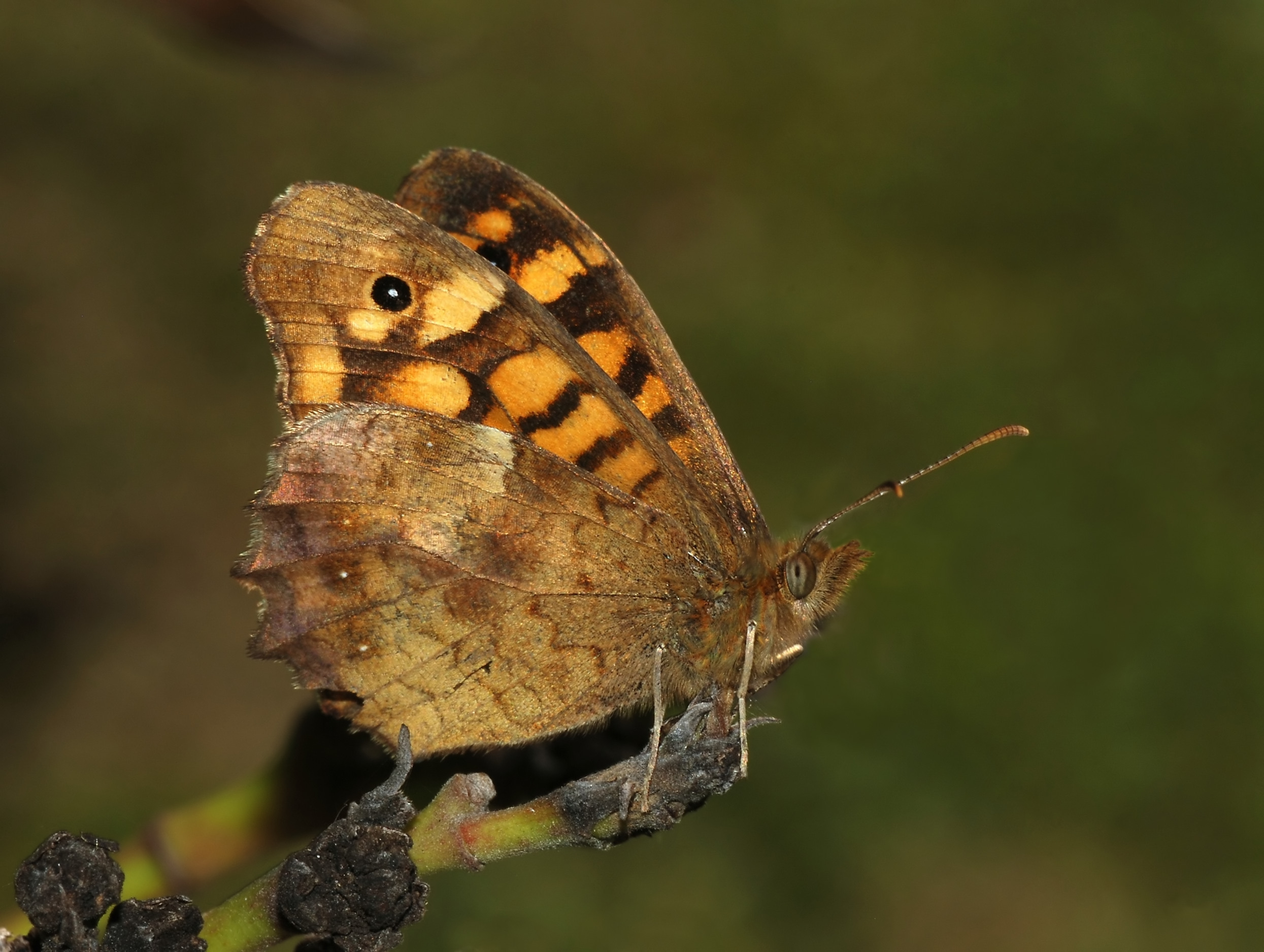
- Male underside

Scientific classification
- Kingdom: Animalia
- Phylum: Arthropoda
- Class: Insecta
- Order: Lepidoptera
- Family: Nymphalidae
- Genus: Pararge
- Species: P. aegeria

Binomial name
- Pararge aegeria (Linnaeus, 1758)

= Speckled wood (butterfly) =

Species of butterfly in the family Nymphalidae

The speckled wood (Pararge aegeria) is a butterfly found in and on the borders of woodland areas throughout much of the Palearctic realm. The species is subdivided into multiple subspecies, including Pararge aegeria aegeria, Pararge aegeria tircis, Pararge aegeria oblita, and Pararge aegeria insula. The color of this butterfly varies between subspecies. The existence of these subspecies is due to variation in morphology down a gradient corresponding to a geographic cline. The background of the wings ranges from brown to orange, and the spots are either pale yellow, white, cream, or a tawny orange. The speckled wood feeds on a variety of grass species. The males of this species exhibit two types of mate locating behaviors: territorial defense and patrolling. The proportion of males exhibiting these two strategies changes based on ecological conditions. The monandrous female must choose which type of male can help her reproduce successfully. Her decision is heavily influenced by environmental conditions.

== Taxonomy ==
The speckled wood belongs to the genus Pararge, which comprises three species: Pararge aegeria, Pararge xiphia, and Pararge xiphioides. Pararge xiphia occurs on the Atlantic island of Madeira. Pararge xiphioides occurs on the Canary Islands. Molecular studies suggest that the African and Madeiran populations are closely related and distinct from European populations of both subspecies, suggesting that Madeira was colonized from Africa and that the African population has a long history of isolation from European populations. Furthermore, the species Pararge aegeria comprises four subspecies: Pararge aegeria aegeria, Pararge aegeria tircis, Pararge aegeria oblita, and Pararge aegeria insula. These subspecies stem from the fact that the speckled wood butterfly exhibits a cline across their range. This butterfly varies morphologically down the 700 km cline, resulting in the different subspecies corresponding to geographical areas.

== Description ==
The average wingspan of both males and females is 5.1 cm (2 in), although males tend to be slightly smaller than females. Furthermore, males possess a row of grayish-brown scent scales on their forewings that is absent in the females. Females have brighter and more distinct markings than males. The subspecies P. a. tircis is brown with pale yellow or cream spots and darker upperwing eyespots. The subspecies P. a. aegeria has a more orange background and the hindwing underside eyespots are reddish brown rather than black or dark gray. The two forms gradually intergrade into each other. Subspecies P. a. oblita is a darker brown, often approaching black with white rather than cream spots. The underside of its hindwings has a marginal pale purple band and a row of conspicuous white spots. The spots of subspecies P. a. insula are a tawny orange rather than a cream color. The underside of the forewings has patches of pale orange, and the underside of the hindwing has a purple-tinged band. Although there is considerable variation with each subspecies, identification of the different subspecies is manageable.

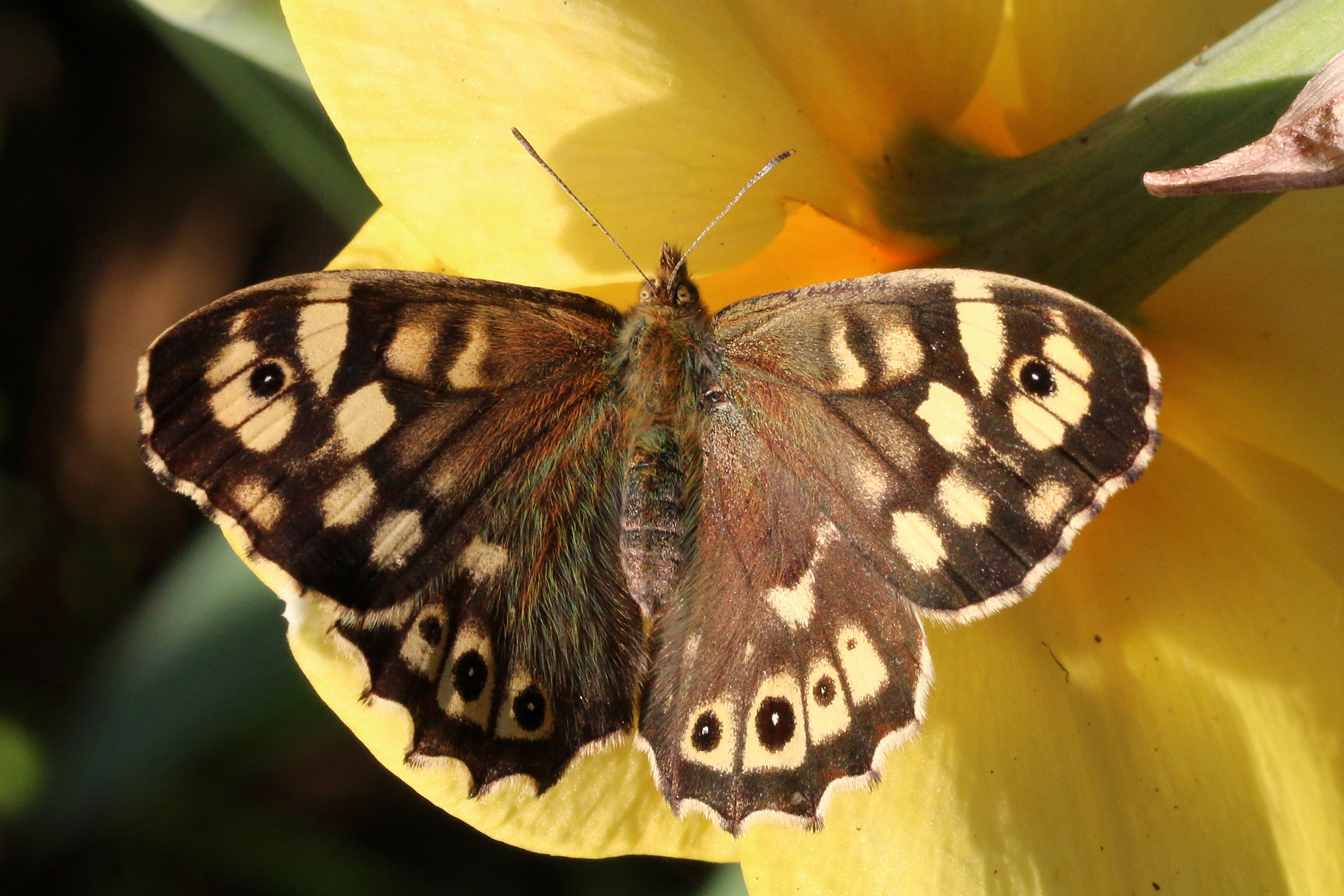
Female

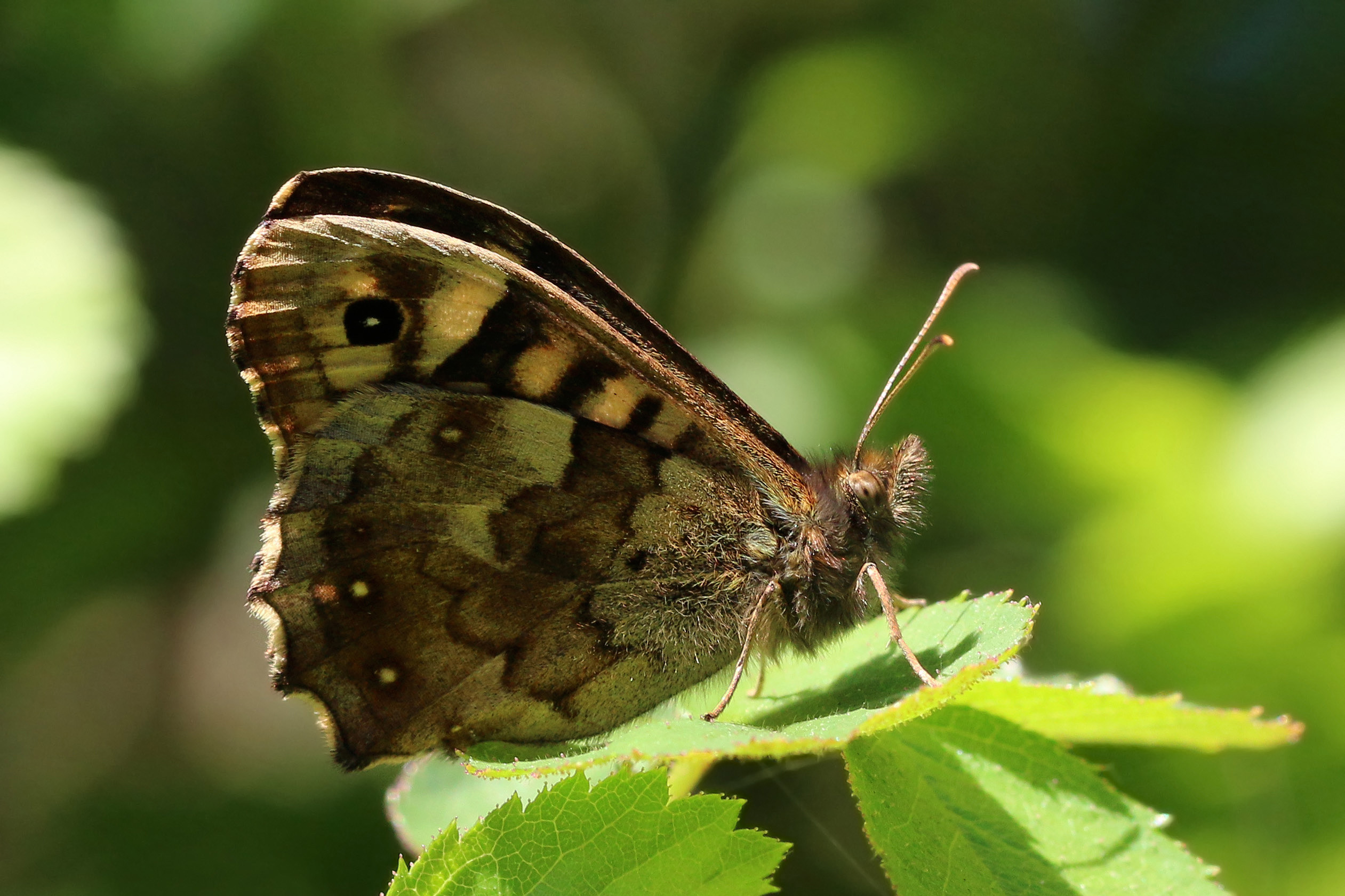
Female underside

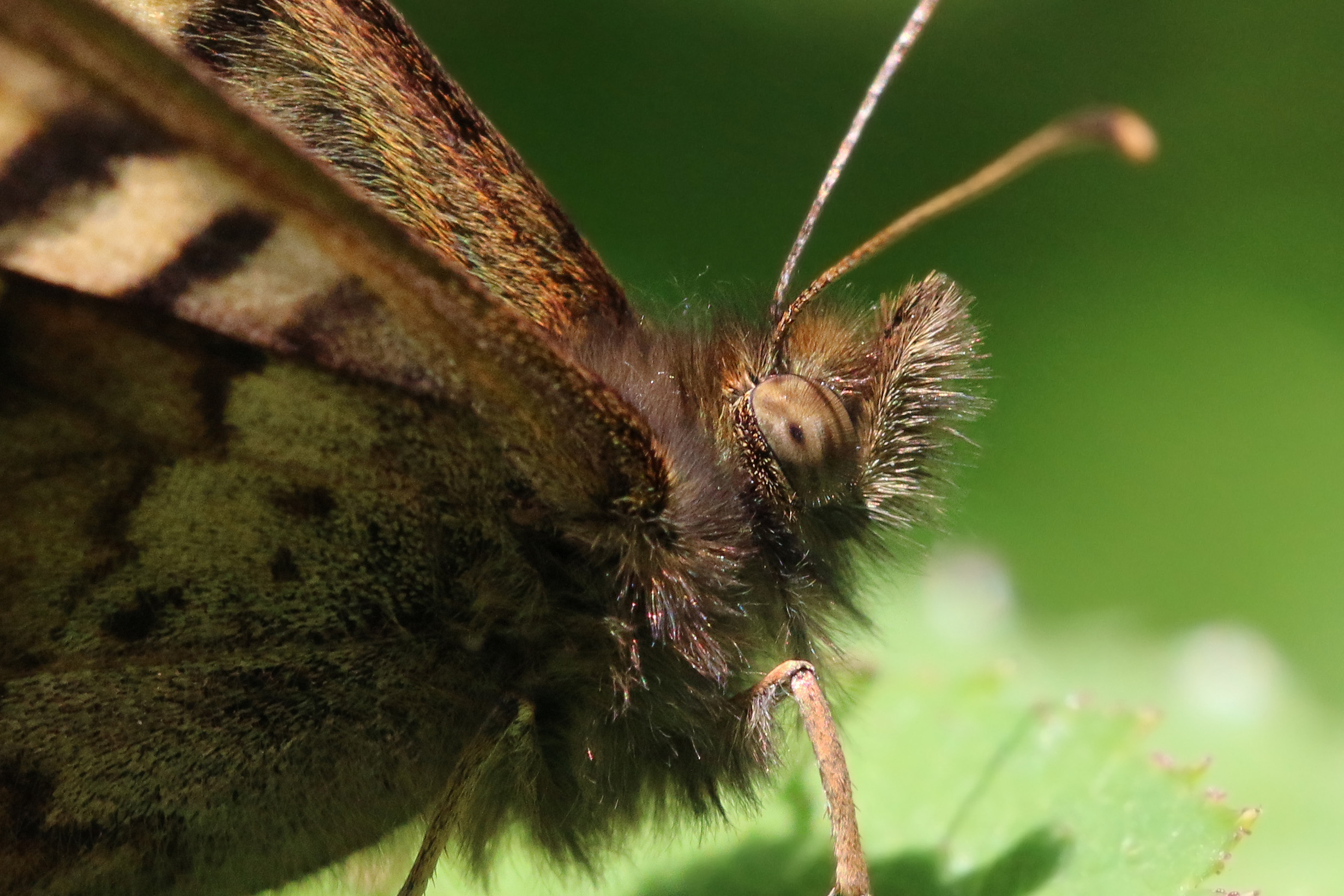
Head of female

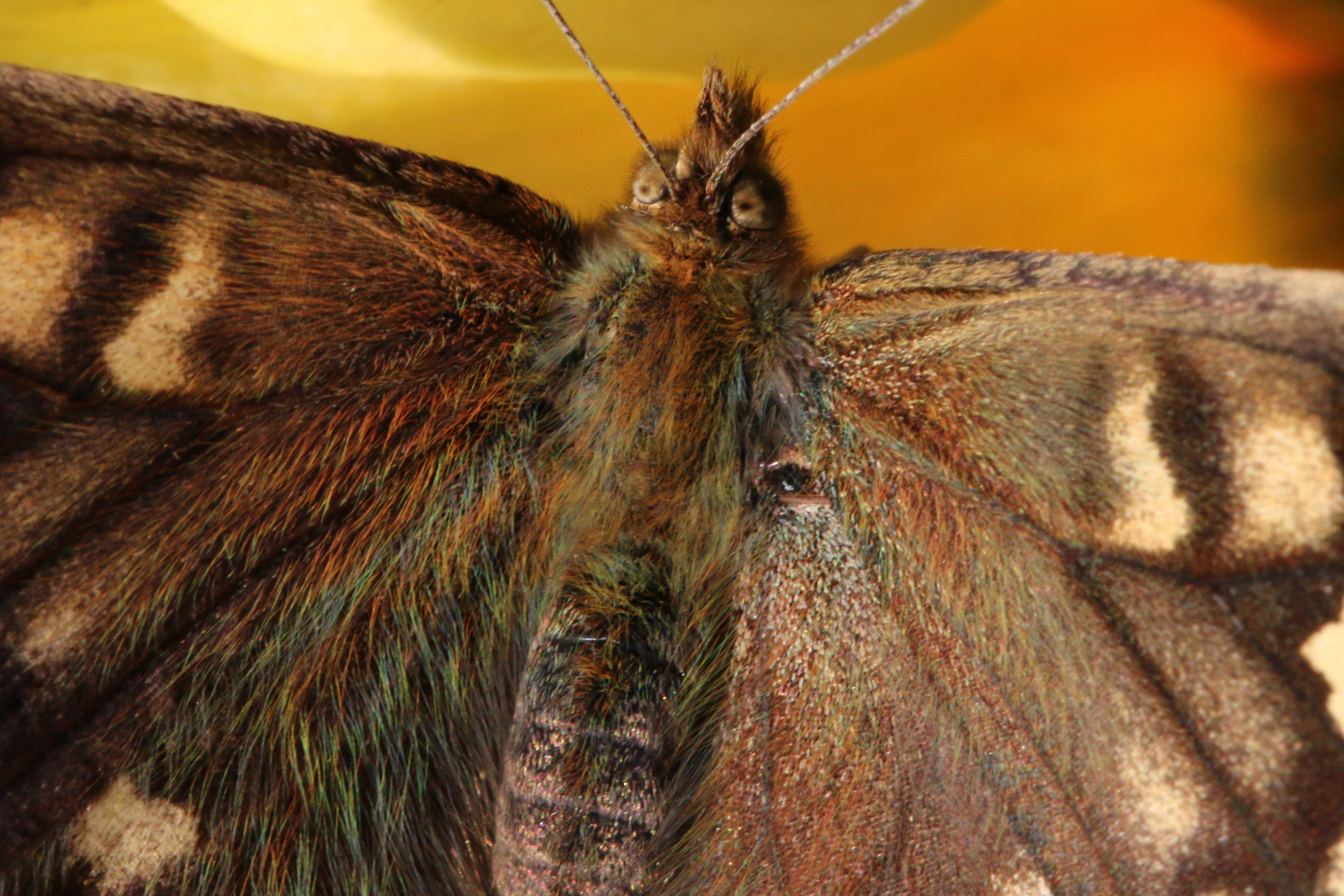
Hairs on wings of a female

The morphology of this butterfly varies as a gradient down its geographic cline from north to south. The northern butterflies in this species have a bigger size, adult body mass, and wing area. These measurements decrease as one moves in a southerly direction in the speckled wood's range. Forewing length on the other hand increases moving in a northerly direction. This is due to the fact that in the cooler temperatures of the northern part of this butterfly's range, the butterflies need larger forewings for thermoregulation. Finally, the northern butterflies are darker than their southern counterpart, and there is a coloration gradient, down their geographical cline.

== Habitat and range ==
The speckled wood occupies a diversity of grassy, flowery habitats in forest, meadow steppe, woods, and glades. It can also be found in urban areas alongside hedges, in wooded urban parks, and occasionally in gardens. Within its range the speckled wood typically prefers damp areas. It is generally found in woodland areas throughout much of the Palearctic realm. P. a. tircis is found in northern and central Europe, Asia Minor, Syria, Russia, and central Asia, and the P. a. aegeria is found in southwestern Europe and North Africa. Two additional subspecies are found within the British Isles: the Scottish speckled wood (P. a. oblita) is restricted to Scotland and its surrounding isles, and the Isles of Scilly speckled wood (P. a. insula) is found only on the Isles of Scilly. P. a. tircis and P. a. aegeria gradually intergrade into each other.

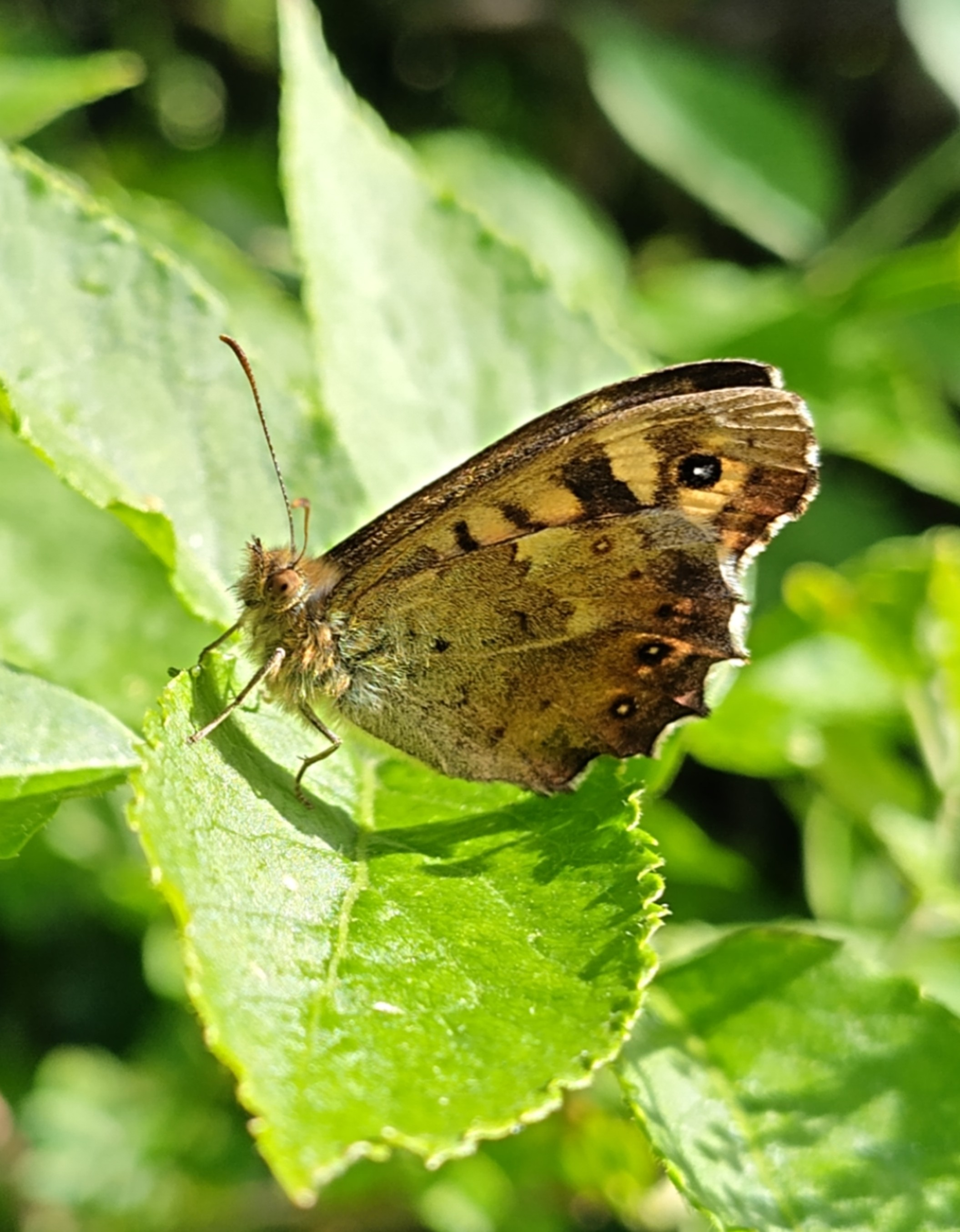
Male P. aegeria, underside view. Colchester, Essex, England.

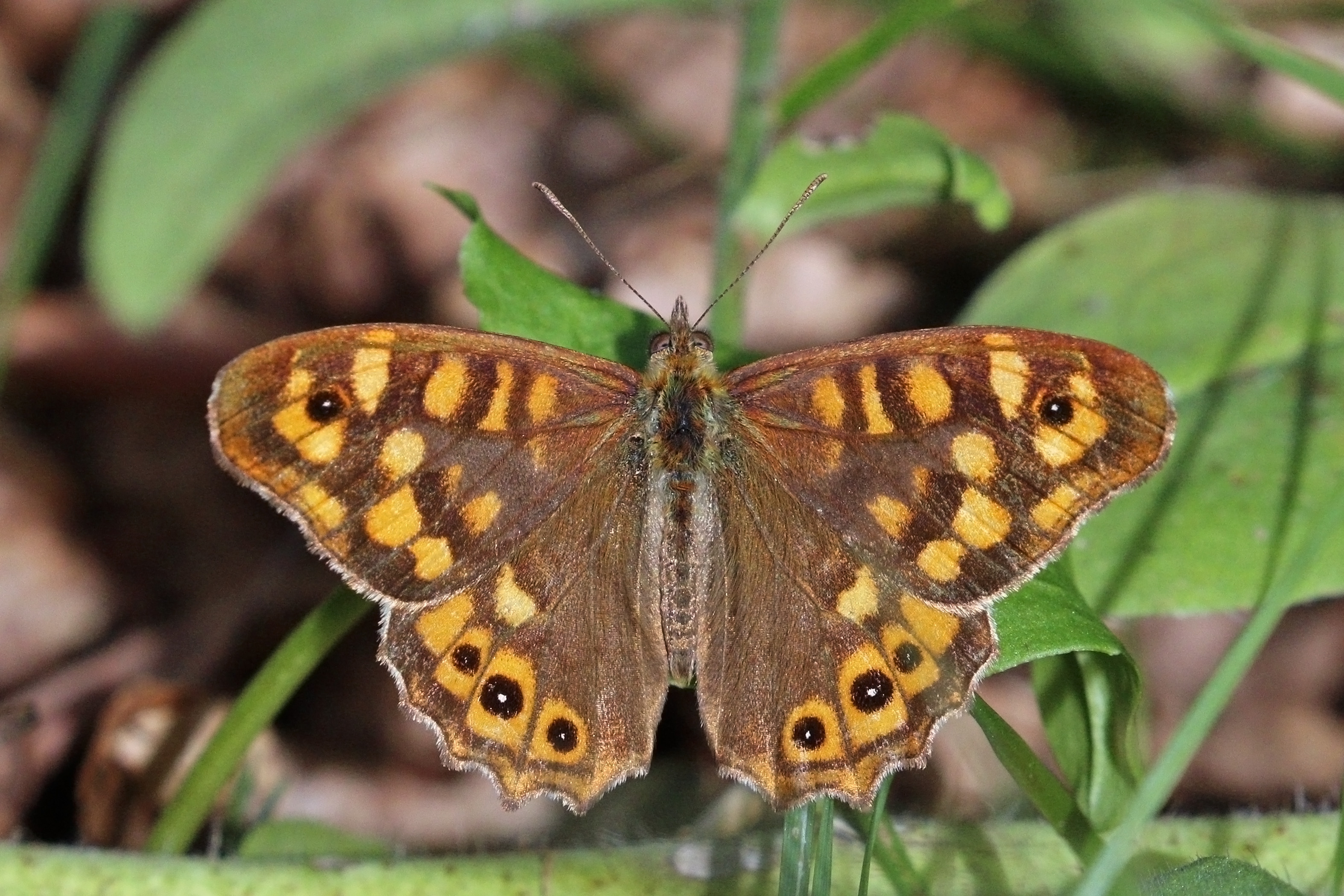
Male P. a. aegeria
Portugal

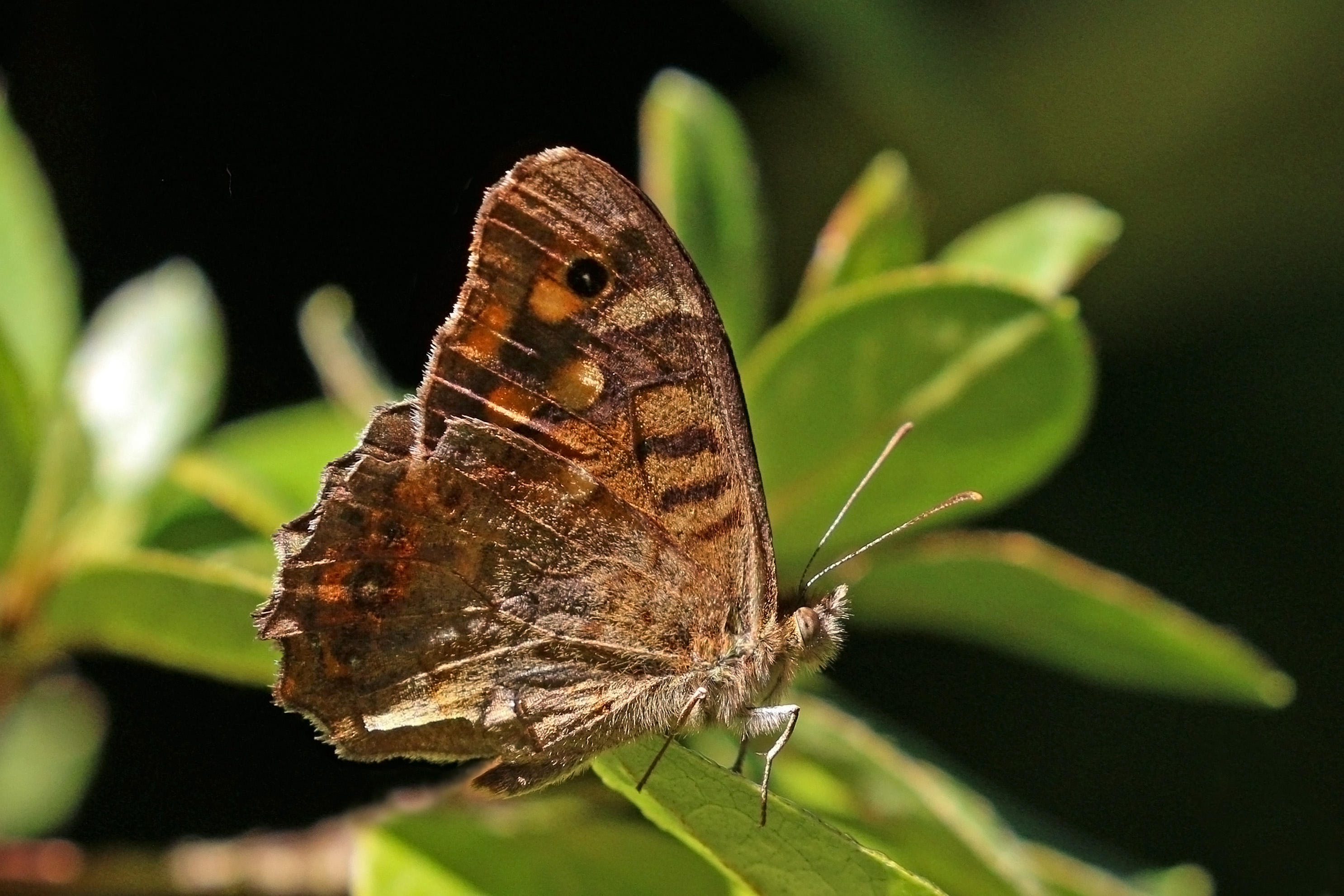
Male P. a. aegeria
Portugal

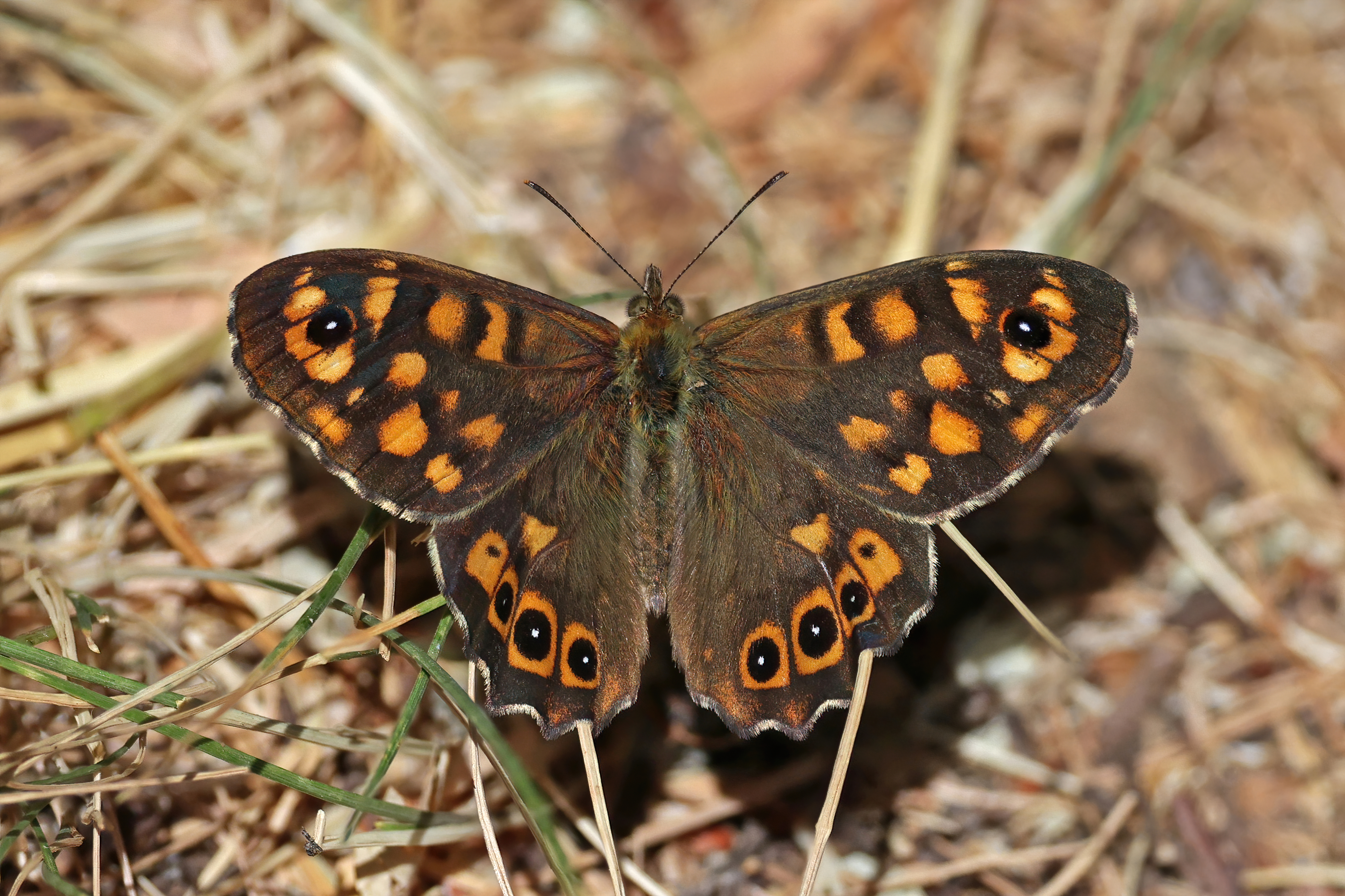
Female P. a. aegeria
Cyprus

== Life history ==
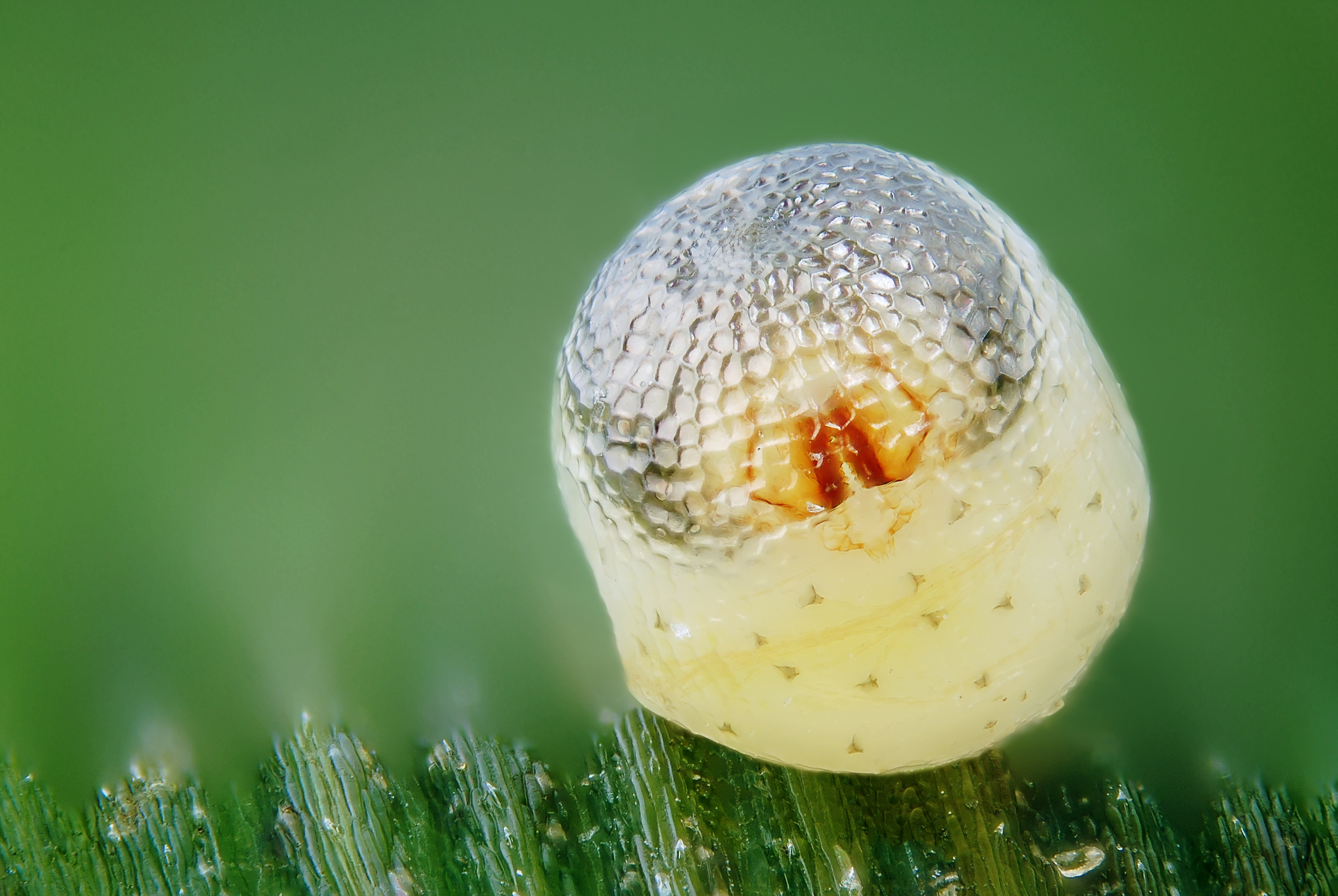
Egg with embryo

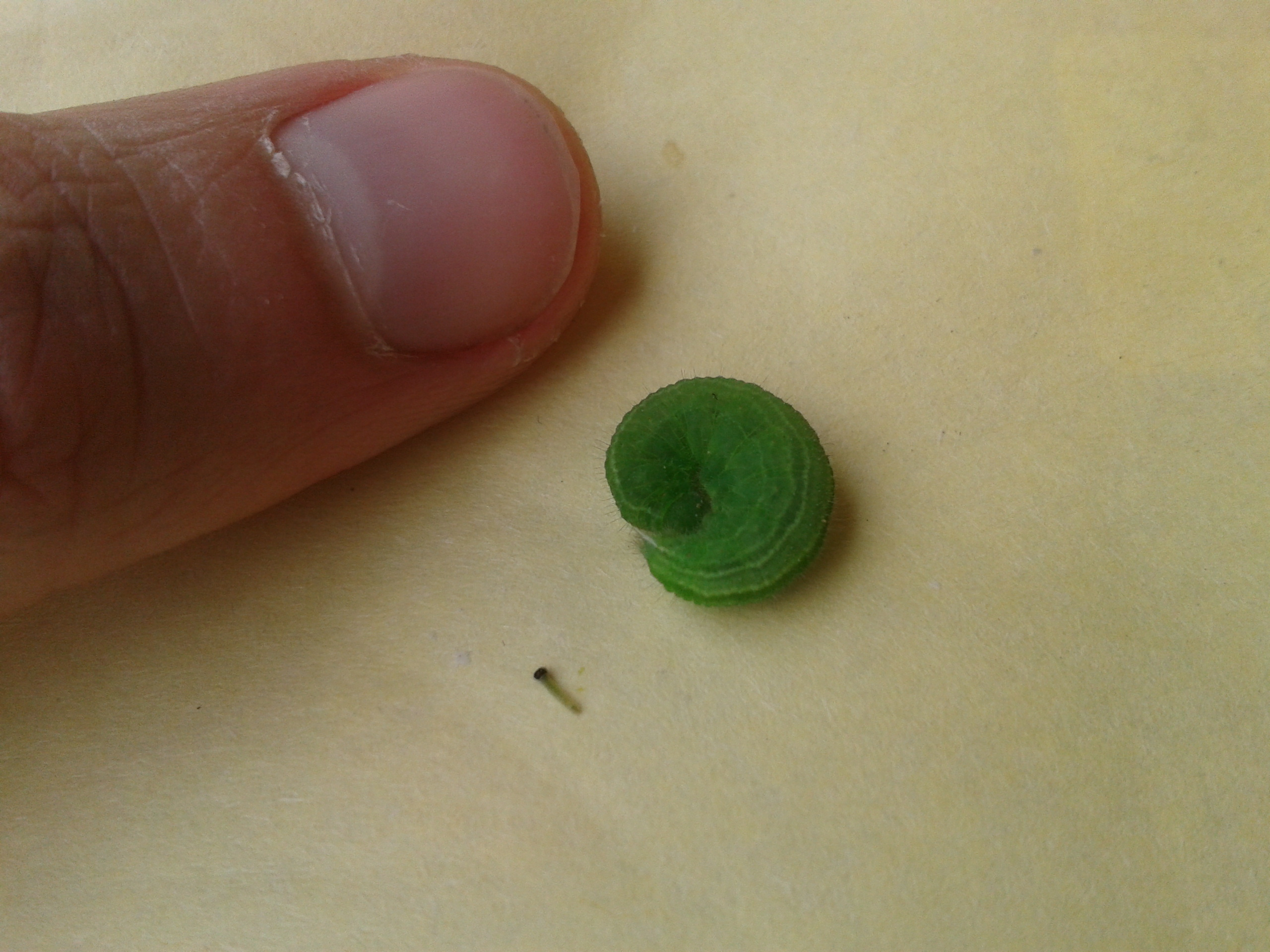
Larvae. First instar (newly hatched) and fourth instar (fully grown) are shown next to a human finger for scale.

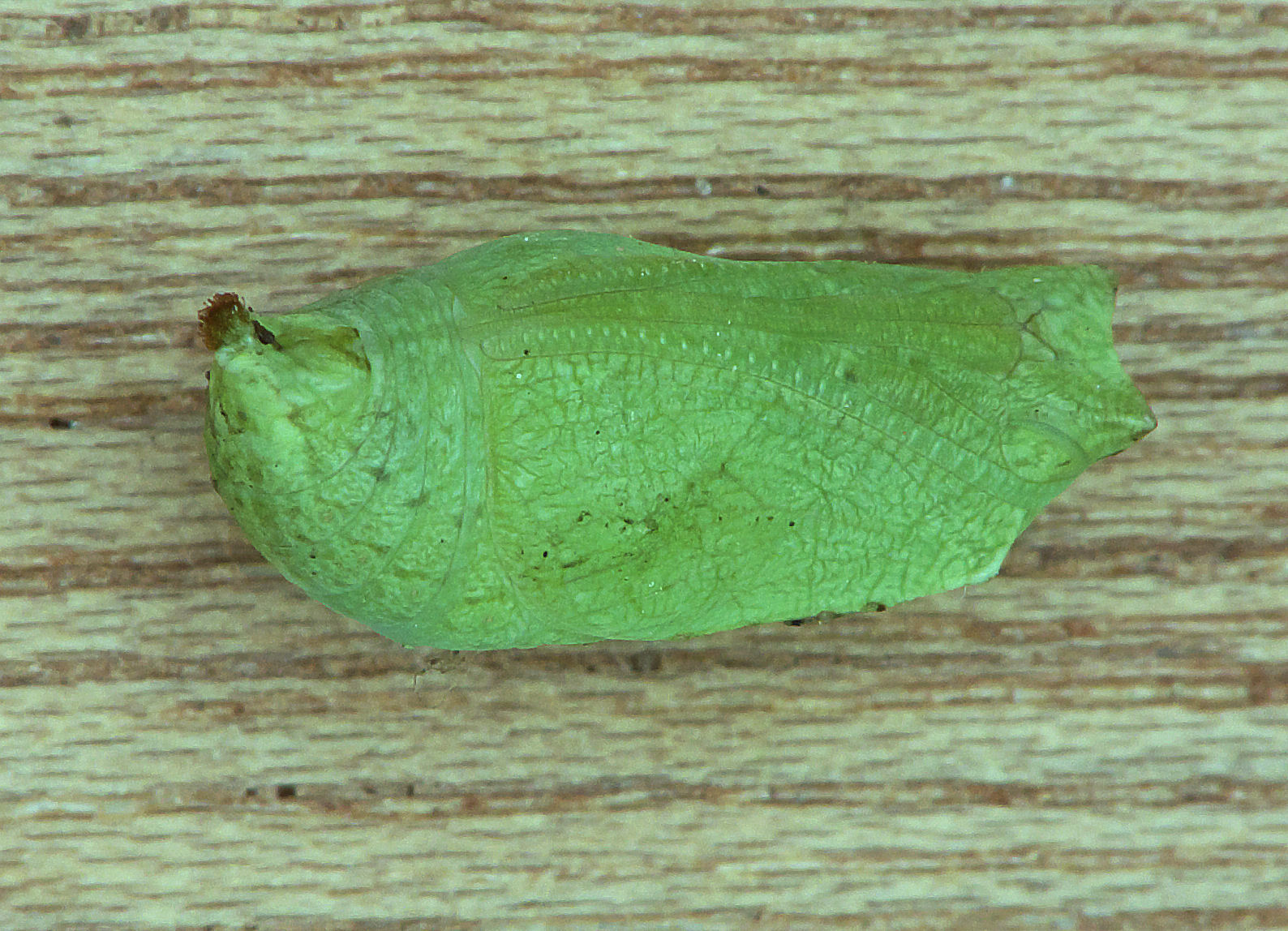
Pupa

The eggs are laid on a variety of grass host plants. The caterpillar is green with a short, forked tail, and the chrysalis (pupa) is green or dark brown. The species is able to overwinter in two totally separated developmental stages, as pupae or as half-grown larvae. This leads to a complicated pattern of several adult flights per year.

=== Food sources ===
Larval food plants include a variety of grass species such as Agropyron (Lebanon), Brachypodium (Palaearctic), Brachypodium sylvaticum (British Isles), Bromus (Malta), Cynodon dactylon (Spain), Dactylis glomerata (British Isles, Europe), Elymus repens (Lebanon), Elytrigia repens (Spain), Holcus lanatus (British Isles), Hordeum (Malta), Melica nutans (Finland), Melica uniflora (Europe), Oryzopsis miliacea (Spain), Poa annua (Lebanon), Poa nemoralis (Czechia/Slovakia), Poa trivialis (Czechia/Slovakia), but the preferred species of grass is the couch grass (Elytrigia repens). The adult is nectar feeding.

=== Growth and development ===
The growth and development of the speckled wood butterfly is dependent on the larval density and the sex of the individual. High larval densities result in decreased survivorship as well as a longer development and smaller adults. However, females are much more adversely affected by this phenomenon. They depend on their larval food stores during oviposition, so a high larval density in the larva stage can result in lower fecundity for females in the adult stage. Males can compensate for their smaller size by feeding as adults or switching mate-locating tactics, so they are less affected by high larval densities. A high growth rate can also negatively affect larval survivorship. Those with high growth rates will also have high weight-loss rates if food becomes scarce. They are less likely to survive if food becomes available once again.

== Mating behavior ==
In the speckled wood butterfly females are monandrous; they typically only mate once within their lifetime. On the other hand, males are polygynous and typically mate multiple times. In order to locate females, males employ one of two strategies: territorial defense and patrolling.

During territorial defense, the male defends a sunny spot in the forest, waiting for females to stop by. Another strategy is patrolling, during which males fly through the forest actively searching for females. Then, the female must make a choice between mating with a patrolling male or a territorial male. By mating with a territorial male, a female can be sure that she has chosen a high quality male, as the ability to defend a territory reflects the genetic quality of a male. Therefore, by choosing a territorial male, the female is being more picky about which male she chooses to mate with.

The choice is most likely dependent on the search costs associated with finding a mate. When actively searching for a male, a female must spend her precious time and energy, which results in search costs, especially when she has a limited life span. As search costs increase, female choosiness for a mate decreases. For example, if a female's life span is shorter, she has a higher cost associated with searching for the ideal mate. Therefore, she is likely to mate within a day of her emergence as an adult, and will most likely mate with a patrolling male, as they are easier to find. However, if a female lifespan is longer, then the search costs associated with finding a mate are lower. The female is then more likely to actively search for a territorial male. Since the search costs vary depending on environmental conditions, strategies vary from population to population.

Males employing different strategies, territorial defense or patrolling, can be differentiated by the number of spots on their hindwings. Those with three spots are more likely to be patrolling males, while those with four spots are more likely to be defending males. The frequency of the two phenotypes depends on the location and time of year. For example, there are more territorial males in areas where there are many sunny spots. Furthermore, the development of wingspots is influenced by environmental conditions. Therefore, the strategy employed by males is heavily dependent on environmental conditions.

== Territorial behavior ==
Territorial defense involves a male flying or perching in a spot of sunlight that pierces through the forest canopy. The speckled wood butterfly spends the night high up in the trees, and territorial activity commences once sunlight passes through the canopy. The males often remain in the same sunspot until the evening, following the sunspot as it moves across the forest floor. The males often perch on vegetation near the forest floor. If a female flies into the territory, the resident male flies after her, the pair drop to the ground, and copulation follows. If another species flies through the sunspot, the resident male ignores the intruder.

However, if a conspecific, a male of the same species, enters the sunspot, the resident male flies towards the intruder almost bumping into him, and the pair fly upwards. The winner flies back towards the forest floor within the sunspot, while the defeated male flies away from the territory. The pattern of flight during this encounter depends on the vegetation. In an open understory, the pair fly straight upwards. In a dense understory, this flight pattern is not possible, so the pair spiral upwards.

In most of these interactions, the conflict is relatively short, and the resident male wins. The intruder most likely backs down as a serious confrontation could be costly, and there is an abundance of equally desirable sunspots. However, if both males believe they are the "resident" male, the conflict escalates. If a previous owner of the sunspot tries to reclaim his territory after he has left for mating, a longer and more costly fight ensues. In these serious fights, the winner of the contest is not predictable.

The abundance of territorial behavior depends on the environmental conditions. At the beginning of the mating season, fights over ownership of a sunspot territory are lengthy. The duration of the conflict quickly decreases during a period of two weeks. This pattern is correlated with the progression of the season, as temperature and male density rise. Sunspots are more attractive when temperatures are low, as they provide the warmth needed for higher levels of activity. As male density increases, it becomes increasingly difficult to hold onto a territory, so territoriality decreases and more males exhibit patrolling behavior.

=== Asymmetry and territoriality ===
In butterflies, asymmetrical wings are observed in three different ways: fluctuating (small, random variations from the standard bilateral symmetry), directional (variations that are biased towards a particular side so one wing is larger than the other), and antisymmetry (similar to directional but half of the individuals of the species find that a particular wing, such as their left, is larger, and the other half of the individuals find that their right is larger.

Both genders of the speckled wood butterfly exhibit asymmetrical wings; however, only males show directional asymmetry (likely to be caused by genetic factors). Also, females show more asymmetry in general compared to males. Within male speckled wood butterflies, the melanic form shows greater directional asymmetry and grows more slowly than the pale, territorial males. Furthermore, males that are most successful in territorial disputes are only slightly asymmetrical, as opposed to complete symmetry or asymmetry; this indicates that sexual selection affects asymmetry.

== Reproduction and offspring ==
A female's fecundity is dependent on body mass, as females deprived from sucrose during their oviposition period have reduced fecundity. Therefore, heavier females will produce a larger number of eggs. In addition to body mass, the number of eggs laid by a female may also be related to the time spent searching for an oviposition site. The number of eggs laid is inversely proportional to egg size. However, egg size was not found to have any influence on egg or larval survival, larval development time, or pupal weight under experimental conditions. One explanation may be that there is a tradeoff between the number of eggs laid and the time spent searching for the optimal oviposition site. A female would produce more eggs in an optimal environment, so she can produce more offspring and increase her reproductive fitness.

=== Paternal investment ===
During copulation in butterfly species, the male deposits a spermatophore in the female consisting of sperm and a secretion high in proteins and lipids. The female uses the nutrients in the spermatophore in egg production. In a polyandrous mating system, where sperm competition is present, it is beneficial for males to deposit a large spermatophore in order to fertilize the largest amount of eggs possible and possibly prevent the female from mating again.

Since most females in the speckled wood butterfly behave monandrously, there is decreased sperm competition, and the male's spermatophore is much smaller relative to other species. The speckled wood male's spermatophore size increases as body mass of the male increases. The spermatophore in the second copulation is significantly smaller, so copulation with a virgin male results in a higher number of larval offspring. Therefore, there is a cost to females associated with mating with a non-virgin male.

== Similar species ==
- Pararge xiphia (Fabricius, 1775) the Madeiran speckled wood butterfly
- Pararge xiphioides Staudinger, 1871 the Canary speckled wood
