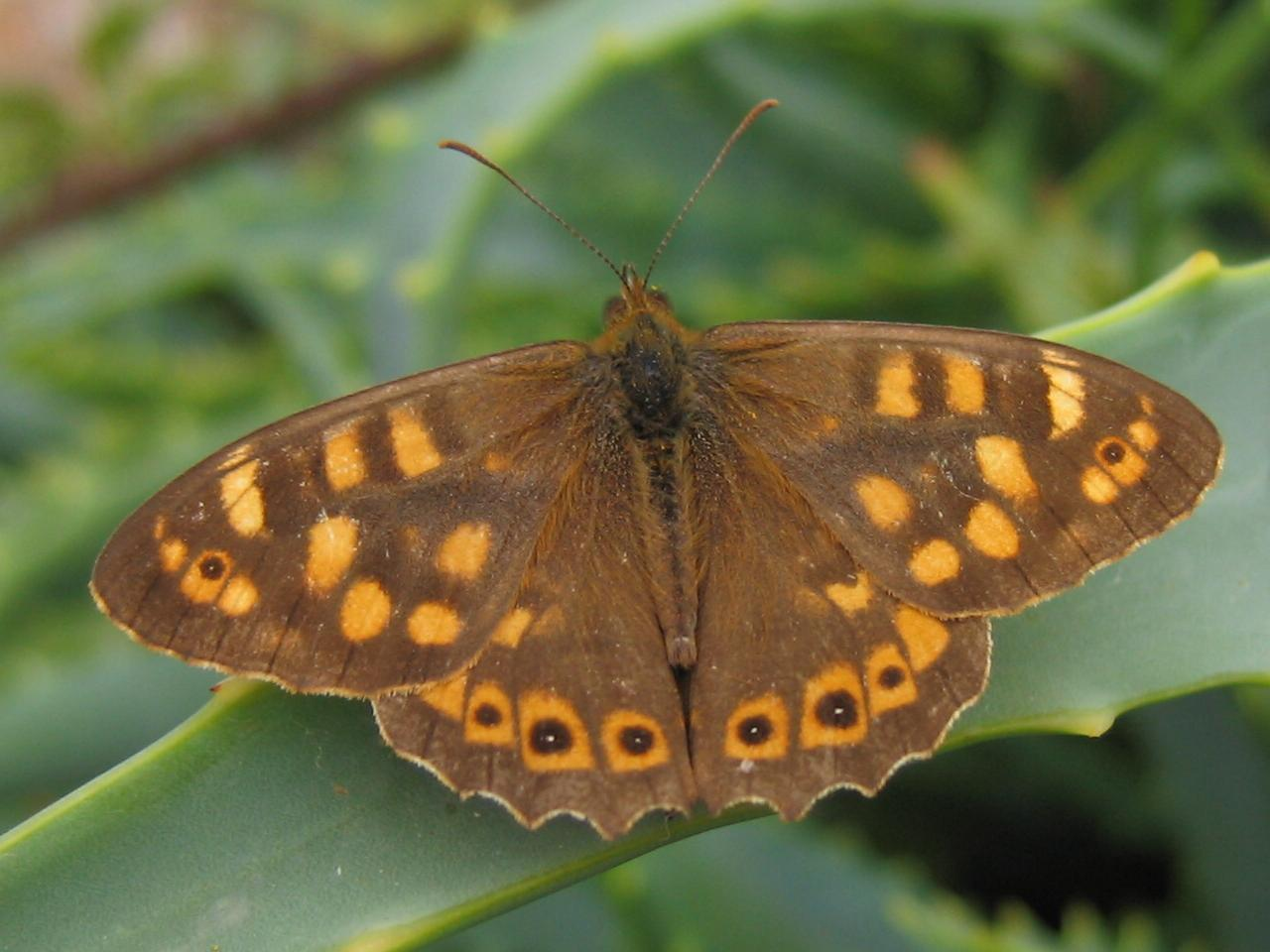

Scientific classification
- Kingdom: Animalia
- Phylum: Arthropoda
- Class: Insecta
- Order: Lepidoptera
- Family: Nymphalidae
- Genus: Pararge
- Species: P. xiphioides

Binomial name
- Pararge xiphioides Staudinger, 1871

= Pararge xiphioides =

Species of butterfly

Pararge xiphioides, the Canary speckled wood, is a butterfly of the family Nymphalidae. It is found in the Canary Islands on La Gomera, La Palma, Tenerife and Gran Canaria.

The wingspan is 40–50 millimetres (1.6–2.0 in). Adults are on wing year-round.

The larvae feed on various plants, including Brachypodium sylvaticum, Agrostis capillaris, Carex divulsa and Luzula forsteri.

It is closely related to the species Pararge aegeria. differing thus xiphioides Stgr. (45a), from the Canary Islands, has the upperside darker on account of the smaller and more red-brown spots, while the underside of the hindwing is lighter, less marmorated and provided with a distinct median band, the costal part of which is shaded with white.
