= Thomas Morong =

American naturalist (1827–1894)

Rev. Thomas Morong (April 15, 1827 – April 26, 1894) was an American botanist and clergyman.

== Biography ==
Morong was born in Cahawba, Alabama to a Massachusetts-born father, Thomas Morong, and a Maryland-born mother Jane Travers. His father owned a store and a plantation. After the death of his father, 15-year-old Morong and his family moved to Woburn, Massachusetts.

After graduating from the Warren Academy and from Amherst, he entered Harvard Law School. However, he soon dropped law school, entering Andover Theological Seminary where he graduated in 1853. The next year he was ordained as a congregational minister. Throughout most of the rest of his life he served at various churches throughout Massachusetts.

In 1861, he built his own greenhouse to study botany. He predominantly worked as a field botanist in the Eastern states. In 1888, he retired from the ministry to focus on botany full-time. That same year, he traveled to South America to collect and study specimen. In 1890, he returned home with 20,000 specimen of plants, as well as field notes.

Soon after the return from his excursion, he was named curator of the herbarium at Columbia University in New York City. Additionally, he taught classes on botany throughout the area. He died at his son's house in 1894 in Boston, Massachusetts. He was a member of the Torrey Botanical Society.

== Selected publications ==
The standard author abbreviation Morong is used to indicate this person as the author when citing a botanical name.

- New species of Potamogeton with Notes upon some published Forms. Bot. Gaz. 5: 50-53 (1880).
- Potamogeton Vaseyi Robbins. Bot. Gaz. 5: 89 (1880).
- Potamogeton Hillii n. sp. Bot. Gaz, 6: 290, 291 (1881).
- Notes on Naiadaceæ. Bot. Gaz. 10: 254-256(1885).
- Collection of aquatic Plants. Bot. Gaz. 11: 139,140,193(1886).
- Revision of the North American Species of Nuphar. Bot. Gaz. 11: 164-169 (1886).
- A new Species of Potamogeton. Bull. Torr. Bot. Club, 13: 45 (1886).
- Naiadaceæ in the Torrey Herbarium. Bull. Torr. Bot. Club, 13: 153-162 (1886).
- Some new or little known American Plants. Bull. Torr. Bot. Club, 14: 51,52 (1887).
- Studies in the Typhaceæ. Bull. Torr. Bot. Club, 15: 1–8; 73-81 (1888).
- A new Water-lily. Bot. Gaz. 13: 124,125 (1888).
- Paraguay and its Flora. Bot. Gaz. 14: 222–227; 240-253 (1889).
- First Glimpses of South American Vegetation. Bull. Torr. Bot. Club, 16: 43-49 (1889).
- The Flora of the Desert of Atacama. Bull. Torr. Bot. Club, 18: 39-48 (1891).
- Myriophyllum Farwellii n. sp. Bull. Torr. Bot. Club, 18: 146, 147 (1891).
- Horticulture in the Copiapo Valley, Chile. Amer. Gard. 12: 227-230 (1891).
- Jesuits' Tea. Bull Pharm. 5: 549-554 (1891).
- Copernicia eenfera. Bull. Pharm. 6: (1892).
- Notes on North American Halorageæ. Bull. Torr. Bot. Club, 18: 229-246 ( 1891).
- Notes on the North American Species of Eriocauleæ. Bull. Torr. Bot. Club, 18: 351-362 (1891).
- Eriocaulon bilobatum n. sp. Bull. Torr. Bot. Club, 19: 226,227 (1892).
- An Enumeration of the Plants collected in Paraguay, 1888–1890. Annals N.Y. Acad. Sci. (1889-1893).
- A Revision of the North American Naiadaceæ Mem. Torr. Bot. Club, 3: Part. 2, pp. 65 (1893).
- A new Species of Listera with notes on other Orchids. Bull. Torr. Bot. Club, 20: 31–39,121,122 (1893).
- Thomas Hogg. Bull Torr. Bot. Club, 20: 217,218 (1893).
- Notes upon various Species of Iridaceæ and other Orders. Bull. Torr. Bot. Club, 20: 467-473 (1893.)
