= Bluebeard (disambiguation) =

Bluebeard is the title character in a 1697 fairy-tale by Charles Perrault.

Bluebeard may also refer to:

== People ==
- Joe Ball (1896–1938), American serial killer
- Clara Green Carl (1877–1962), American suspected serial killer
- Alfred Leonard Cline (1888–1948), American serial killer
- Alexey Gromov (born 1970), Russian serial killer
- Johann Otto Hoch (1855–1906), German-American serial killer
- Arwed Imiela (1929–1982), German serial killer
- Henri Désiré Landru (1869–1922), French serial killer
- Robin Page (1932–2015), artist also known as Bluebeard
- Francisco Guerrero Pérez (1840–1910), Mexican serial killer
- Harry Powers (1892–1932), Dutch-American serial killer
- Gilles de Rais (c. 1405–1440), Baron de Rais, medieval serial killer
- Helmuth Schmidt (1876–1918), American serial killer

== Film ==
- Blue Beard (1901 film), a film by Georges Méliès
- Bluebeard (1944 film), a film by Edgar G. Ulmer, starring John Carradine
- Bluebeard (1951 film), a film by Christian-Jaque
- Bluebeard (1955 film), a Mexican comedy film
- Bluebeard (1972 film), a film by Edward Dmytryk, starring Richard Burton
- Bluebeard (2009 film), a film by Catherine Breillat, starring Dominique Thomas
- Bluebeard (2016 film), an Argentine film
- Bluebeard (2017 film), a film by Lee Soo-yeon
- Landru (film) or Bluebeard, a 1963 French film by Claude Chabrol, starring Charles Denner

== Literature ==
- Bluebeard (Frisch novel), a 1982 novel by Max Frisch
- Bluebeard (Vonnegut novel), a 1987 novel by Kurt Vonnegut
- Bluebeard, a 1970 play by Charles Ludlam
- Bluebeard's Castle, a 2023 novel by Anna Biller
- Fables (comics), a comic book series published 2002 and 2015 featuring Bluebeard from the fairy-tale among its characters.

== Music ==
- Bluebeard's Castle, opera by Béla Bartók
- Barbe-bleue (opera) (Blue-beard), an 1866 operetta by Jacques Offenbach
- Bluebeard, an operetta known for the song "If Ever I Cease to Love"
- Blue Beard, Jr., a 1889 musical by Clay M. Greene, Fred J. Eustis, Richard Maddern, and John Joseph Braham Sr.
- Bluebeard (ballet), a ballet choreographed by Marius Petipa to the music of Pyotr Schenk
- "Bluebeard" (song), a 1993 song by Cocteau Twins from Four-Calendar Café
- "Bluebeard", a 1996 song by Combustible Edison from Schizophonic!
- "Blue Beard", a 2010 song by Band of Horses from the album Infinite Arms

== Other uses ==
- Caryopteris or bluebeards, a genus of the mint family
  - Caryopteris × clandonensis, the bluebeard commonly found in gardens
- Bluebeard (restaurant), a restaurant in the US state of Indiana
- The callsigns of eight American Sea Stallion helicopters in Operation Eagle Claw

== See also ==
- Mavi Sakal ("Bluebeard" in Turkish), a Turkish rock band formed in 1980
- List of plants known as bluebead
- Bluebeat (disambiguation)
