= Personal advertisement =

Type of newspaper advertisement

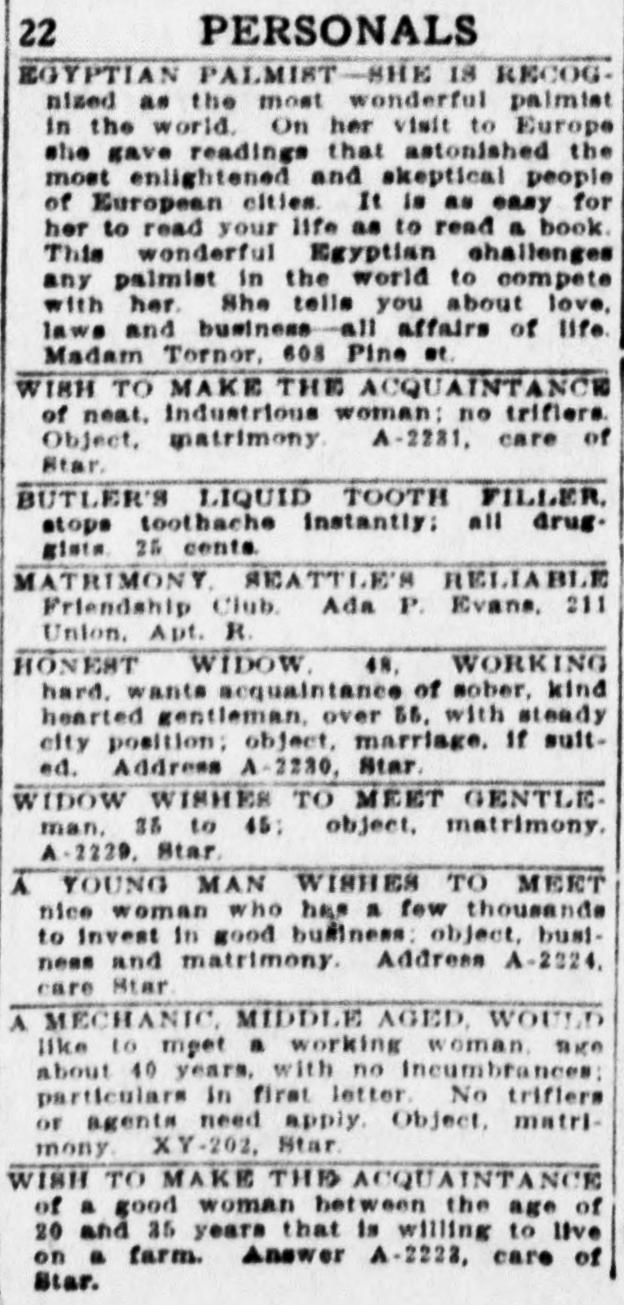
The personals section in the January 13, 1914, issue of The Seattle Star

A personal advertisement, sometimes called a contact ad, is a form of classified advertising in which a person seeks to find another person for friendship, romance, marriage, or sexual activity. In British English, it is commonly known as an advert in a lonely hearts column. In India, it is called a dating ad or matrimonial ad.

The earliest personal ads were placed in newspapers among other classified ads, and typically had matrimony as the objective. As interest in personal ads grew, newspapers provided personals sections specifically for those ads. Later, newspapers and magazines for the sole purpose of personal ads were published. Lonely hearts clubs were organized in the 20th century to provide listings of ads to their fee-paying members. With the advent of the Internet, personal ads began to appear on online sites as well, eventually turning into profiles on dating sites and apps.

Personal ads have been described by a researcher as "a valuable way of finding potential mates for those whose social world has been artificially constrained by contemporary urban life and the demands of modern employment practices". However, personals have also been used by criminals—con artists, fraudsters, and killers—to find and lure victims.

Public opinion toward personal ads has varied over time, from disapproval and suspicion in the 17th and 18th centuries, to a patriotic service in the United States during the Civil War, and to general public acceptance in the modern day.

== History ==
The earliest personal ads in England and the United States were satirical. A London magazine published a satirical marriage ad in 1660, supposedly from a widow urgently in need of "any man that is Able to labour in her Corporation". By 1691, entire catalogs of satirical ads for husbands and wives were published for entertainment. The New-England Courant, by brothers James and Benjamin Franklin, printed a satirical marriage ad on its front page on April 13, 1722, ridiculing those who married for money.

The first genuine personal ad in England was published on July 19, 1695, in a weekly pamphlet published by John Houghton. London's 53 major newspapers all published matrimonial ads by 1710. In 1761, the first personal ad in England written by a woman was published in the Aris Gazette. In addition to the offices of the newspapers themselves, various local businesses, such as haberdashers, booksellers, and especially coffee houses, accepted replies to personal ads on behalf of the advertisers. As more women began to place ads, more discreet shops and libraries became the preferred intermediaries, as only men frequented coffee houses.

Possibly the earliest genuine personal ad in the United States was published on February 23, 1759, on page 3 of the Boston Evening-Post. The Public Ledger in Philadelphia, founded in 1836, was the first newspaper in the United States to feature personal ads regularly. Marriage ads in the Ledger cost twenty-five cents. In 1840, an editorial in the paper claimed that most ads received 25–500 replies on average. From 1866 until the 20th century, the most widely read newspaper in the United States, the New York Herald, printed personal ads on the front page.

In France in 1791, the commercial circular Courrier de l'Hymen printed adds for spouses. The magazine Le Chasseur français (The French Hunter) first published matrimonial ads in the 1880s.

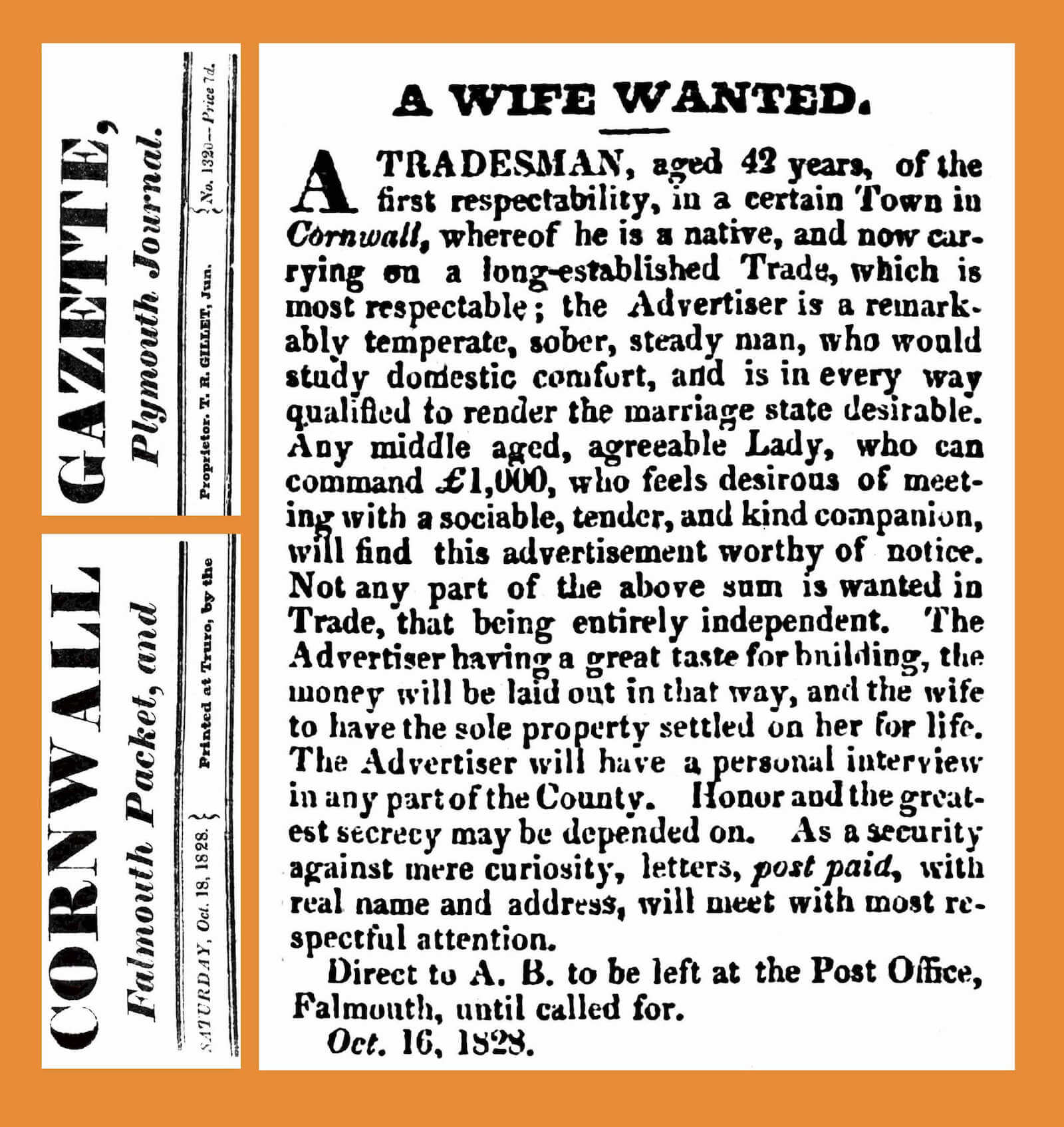
In an 1828 "Wife Wanted" advertisement, an Englishman claiming a "great taste for building" pledges to apply a prospective wife's dowry-like £1000+ to build property that will be "settled on her for life".

Many 18th-century newspaper readers considered the personal ads to be jokes, hoaxes, or scams. Georgian society enjoyed mocking personal ads in plays such as Isaac Bickerstaffe's Love in the City, W. T. Moncrieff's Wanted: a wife, Sarah Gardner's The Advertisement, George Macfarren's Winning a Husband, and Maria Hunter's Fitzroy. A popular anonymous novel in 1799 was Belinda; or, An Advertisement for a Husband. Newspapers in England reported on successful marriages resulting from personal ads, and printed cautionary tales when an advertiser was made to look foolish or found himself trapped in an unfortunate pairing. American newspapers printed stories ridiculing matrimonial ads and editorials accusing the ads of soliciting nonmarital sex.

In the United States, women placing or answering personal ads were met with public disapproval and suspicion. This changed during the Civil War: soldiers and sailors placed personal ads to find correspondents, and for a woman to reply to these ads was considered a patriotic act. Many military men and their correspondents formed romantic relationships.

In 1870, entrepreneur Leslie Fraser Duncan established the Matrimonial News in England, offering forty-word ads for six pence. In the following year Duncan opened offices in San Francisco and in Kansas City, Missouri. Publishing thousands of personal ads, Matrimonial News served for three decades to "promote marriage and conjugal felicity". Many ads included photographs. The cost to men for a forty-word ad was twenty-five cents; women's ads (also limited to forty words) were free; additional words cost one cent per word for both men and women. Replies to ads were routed through the Matrimonial News offices. By the 1890s Matrimonial News was printing a large number of fake ads. Between 1870 and 1900, at least twenty periodicals dedicated to personal ads had been launched in England.

In 1885, a group of married Black women in Arizona Territory formed the Busy Bee Club to advertise for wives for Arizona miners, hoping to reduce violence in the mining camps and encourage Black women to move to the area.

A unique magazine was established in England in 1898, Round-About. It was dedicated to "companionship" ads for people wishing to enter in correspondence with those of the opposite sex. Ads seeking companionship or correspondence, rather than strictly marriage, became more frequent in the early 20th century. The publisher of a popular magazine, The Link, was charged in 1921 for conspiring to corrupt public morals by "introducing men to men for unnatural and grossly indecent practices" as gay men were placing discreetly worded ads in The Link.

In the United States, the number of personal ads decreased drastically during the 1930s through the 1950s, as dating became more common and acceptable, more men and women were attending college, and couples had greater mobility as cars were more available. The Village Voice began publishing personal ads in the 1960s, and ads from swingers appeared in the San Francisco Chronicle in 1961.

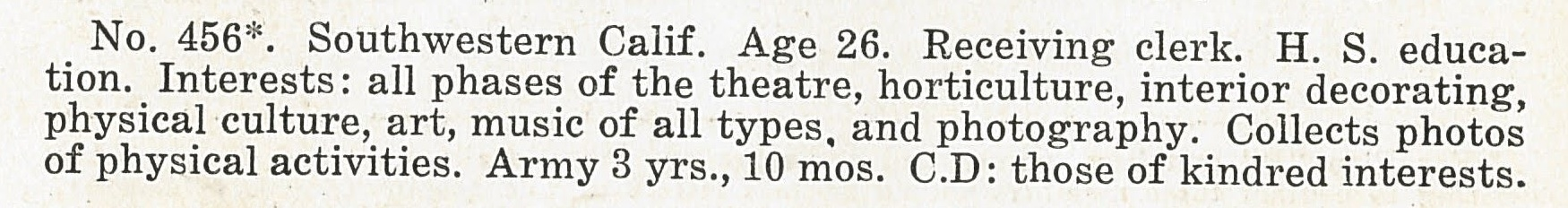
An advertisement from a 1948 issue of The Hobby Directory. Unable to advertise their orientation openly, gay men used coded references to interests such as theatre, interior decorating, and "photos of physical activities" to seek one another out.

The earliest periodical used for gay personals was The Hobby Directory, established in 1946 by the National Association of Hobbyists for Men and Boys. The magazine consisted solely of personal ads, purportedly for members to "find hobby friends". The Hobby Directory was openly sold in craft stores.

Matrimonial or "lonely hearts" clubs began forming in the 20th century, primarily in the United States. These clubs accepted ads from their members for an enrollment fee. Some clubs published papers and magazines dedicated to members' ads or compiled the ads into lists and catalogs that were mailed to the club members. Post-World War II, lonely hearts clubs and marriage advisory bureaus became a huge business in West Germany. (Note: The term "lonely hearts club" is also used to refer to organizations that arrange introductions to potential partners, online dating sites, and to physical singles clubs.) The "lonely hearts" designation reflected the social stigma associated with personal ads. There were at least 500 lonely hearts clubs by 1961, with membership estimates between 100,000 and 4 million. Club operators referred to themselves as "marriage brokers". As computer dating and single clubs became available, lonely hearts clubs diminished.

Magazines and newspapers for matrimonial ads had mostly disappeared in 1961 in England, while newspapers and magazines devoted to personal ads—traditional, explicit, and aberrant—proliferated in the United States during the late 1960s. The underground paper International Times, founded in 1966, was the first to publish openly gay personal ads. After homosexual acts were decriminalized in England in 1967, new publications featuring personal ads for homosexuals were established, such as Jeffrey and Gay Times, and gay ads began to appear in mainstream publications by the end of the 1970s.

By the late 1980s, publications as disparate as the New York Law Journal and The New York Review of Books added personal ads to their content. Placing an ad to find a romantic partner had become an acceptable alternative to conventional methods of meeting people.

A new form of personal ad began to appear in the 1990s: ads to find reproductive partners. Typically placed by lesbians or gay men, the ads seek someone to donate eggs or sperm to enable the advertisers to have children.

The first online dating service was founded by Joan Ball in 1964. Operation Match, begun in 1965, was the first online dating service in the United States. These services involved questionnaires and computer matching. Match.com in 1995 was one of the first sites to host personal ads online. At the time, few people had computer access. As Internet access increased, so did interest in online personal ads and computer dating, with the first free dating sites appearing between 2005 and 2010. With smartphones, dating apps such as Tinder became popular. While personal ads in publications never gained social acceptance in France, the use of online dating sites are more popular. Online personal ads are freed from the space limitations of print ads. Additionally, websites and apps that host personals typically provide automated menus or sortable categories for common information, freeing the advertiser to tailor the narrative portion of the ad to their specific objectives.

== Historical motivations ==
Multiple aspects of 19th-century society in England combined to make personal ads a viable alternative: the general confinement of women to "private life"; professions such as trade or the military, limiting both the time and social network to meet potential partners; remote locations with small populations; urban expansion that brought many people to the cities, where they were apart from the social and familial networks they had been accustomed to. For some, there were no potential partners nearby; for others, there were potential partners but no means of meeting them in a socially acceptable manner. In the United States, between 1820 and 1860, populations in cites had increased by 797%, many of the new urbanites lacking social or family networks through which they might meet potential partners.

Women in particular found personal ads to be a means for exercising some control over their circumstances. An 1890 study of female respondents to personal ads in the United States found that they sought independence from societal expectations and a degree of equality in the matter of marriage. (The criminologist who performed the study was scandalized by the responses, believing "they bordered on moral depravity".)

The years following the Civil War in the United States brought a huge mismatch in the number of available men in the east (more than 600,000 killed in the war) and in the number of available women on the western frontier, where mostly men had migrated to pursue mining, fur trading, farming, logging, and exploring. Rural areas of Illinois in the 1850s, for example, averaged one woman for every twenty-five men. In England, the 1861 census revealed a significant numerical surplus of women, due to emigration and earlier deaths. States in the western United States which suffered from the imbalance between men and women passed numerous laws intended to encourage women to immigrate, such as property protection for women (as opposed to coverture laws common in eastern states) and female suffrage. The welcoming political climate was an incentive for women to respond to marriage ads and marriage recruiting efforts.

In the early 20th century, answering matrimonial ads was a route to entering the United States after immigration limits became more restrictive. It was also a means of escaping war-torn regions. In 1922, two ships docked in New York with 900 mail-order brides from Turkey, Romania, Armenia, and Greece, fleeing the Greco-Turkish War.

== Observations ==
Most ads in the 1700s were placed by men; of those placed by women, the majority were by widows. The earliest ads placed an emphasis on economic factors, but by the end of the 18th century, ads revealed an interest in romantic love. Despite the shifting interest toward compatibility and personality, money continued to be mentioned in ads through the 19th century.

From about 1820 to 1870, ads from women rarely appeared. By 1884, working-class men and women joined the middle class in the personal ad pages.

Ads in the 19th century were mostly placed by men in their twenties, frequently claiming to be "of good character" and "respectable". The ads indicated that the top priority for respondents was age, with 18–25 being most desirable. The men sought personality traits such as "amiable", "agreeable", or "of good disposition". They also used terms reflecting a degree of class consciousness, such as "a young lady of refinement", "respectably connected", and a "good English education". With the introduction of the Kodak camera in 1888, personal ads became more likely to include a photograph or to state "photos exchanged".

Personal ads placed in the 1920s no longer focused on an object of matrimony, but might instead seek companionship, a partner for activities, or sexual dalliances. Ads for same-sex partners used discreet phrasing to avoid legal difficulties.

After World War I, there was a surplus of 1.7 million women in England, and the number of personal ads placed by women began to exceed the number placed by men.

While early ads frequently specified marriage as the objective, in later years, ads revealed a greater range of expectations, such as the ambiguous "to meet", companionship, long-term relationship, platonic friendships, and casual sexual encounters. Modern ads generally include information about the advertiser (such as sex, age, physical appearance, ethnic group, religion, interests, professional and personal characteristics), and information about the type of person the advertiser is seeking.

Men placing ads seeking women mostly specify younger ages, while women placing ads seeking men look for partners their age or older. Some analyses identify ads by favored groups (older men and younger women) as stating more requirements for the desired partner, while ads by less valuable groups (younger men and older women) being less restrictive. In general, the older the advertiser, the more likely that their ad includes language to mitigate their age, such as "youthful 44", "young at heart", or "young outlook".

Multiple studies of personal ads in the 20th century found that ads from men seeking women are more likely to place importance on physical attractiveness and ads from women seeking men are more likely to focus on financial security and psychological characteristics. Research in 1998 found increased mentions of professional and personality characteristics by both men and women, as well as more mentions of attractiveness of potential partners in ads placed by women. It also noted an emphasis on nonsmoking by both men and women. A 1989 study found an emphasis on health in gay ads, likely related to the AIDS crisis.

Ads placed by lesbians value personal characteristics, such as humor and intelligence, and also mates who describe themselves as "feminine". They are generally less likely than heterosexual women to include descriptions of their own physical characteristics in their ads.

Ads placed by gay men place an importance on physical attractiveness similar to heterosexual men. Gay men seeking sexual activities indicate a greater age range acceptable than those seeking long-term relationships.

In India, matrimonial ads are published in the Sunday editions of major national and regional newspapers. Ads are generally placed by families when it is not feasible to find prospective spouses within their familial or social networks. Matrimonials generally include caste markers, personal attributes, and educational and professional qualifications. The matrimonial listings are grouped first by groom or bride wanted; next, by native language; third, by religion; and fourth, by caste.

Personal ad magazines in Russia organize ads in categories such as "He seeks her. Matrimony", "She seeks him. Flirt", "He seeks him", "She seeks her", and "For couples".

== Abbreviations ==
Due to space limitations in print ads, abbreviations for the vocabulary of personal ads became conventional in the 20th century. Some of the earliest abbreviations appeared in personal ads in Gay Times.

Some abbreviations describe the advertiser and target of the ad by marital status, ethnic group, and sex, such as MWM (married white male) and DBF (divorced black female). Some indicated a common characteristic, such as GSOH (good sense of humor) and NS (non-smoking).

In India, matrimonial ads use a unique shorthand so ads can fit within the restraint of 50 words or less. For example, BHP stands for biodata (résumé), horoscope, and photograph; "veg" means vegetarian; and VF is the abbreviation for very fair (light-skinned).

== Crimes ==
Theft, fraud, and seduction were the crimes most common with matrimonial ads. By 1900, most jurisdictions in the United States had criminalized seduction, allowed punitive and exemplary damages for breach of promise actions, and increased recognition of common-law marriages, all of which helped reduce some crimes associated with matrimonial ads.

In Sweden, the colloquial saying "sun and spring" (Sol-och-vårande) to mean "love fraud" refers to fraudster Karl Vesterberg, who placed personal ads in the early 1900s, signing each with sol-och-vårande. The most famous "sun and spring" was Gustaf Raskenstam, who used personal ads to defraud over a hundred women of money in the 1940s.

The U.S. Postal Service warned consumers of fraudulent activity associated with "lonely hearts clubs" in its 1967 Mail Fraud booklet. Some people use personal ads to ask for money, supposedly to travel to meet the other person. The booklet describes one individual who claimed to have a potential fortune in oil claims, needing "only another few thousand dollars" for development. Earning an estimated $50,000 a year through personal ads, he was eventually convicted of mail fraud and sentenced to prison. In one instance, a man placed personal ads in publications throughout the United States, claiming to be a single Asian female, and eventually bilking over 400 men of approximately $280,000. He later pled guilty to mail fraud.

From 2011 to 2016, crimes related to online dating increased by almost 400 percent.

Although murder was more rare than theft and fraud, a number of murderers used personal ads to find potential victims. Notable examples include:

- Belle Gunness was a serial killer with at least 14 victims, active 1884–1908.
- Johann Otto Hoch, also known as the Bluebeard Murderer and the Chicago Bluebeard, was a bigamist and murderer, believed to have killed up to 50 victims, active 1890–1905.
- Béla Kiss was a serial killer in Hungary with at least 24 victims, active between 1900–1914.
- Helmuth Schmidt was a suspected serial killer of 1–4+ victims, active 1913–1917.
- Henri Désiré Landru, nicknamed the Bluebeard of Gambais, was a serial killer in France with at least 11 victims, active 1915–1919.
- Eva Brandon Rablen answered a personal ad in 1928 and then poisoned her new husband three days after the wedding, a murder that the Ogden Standard Examiner called "the most notorious case of its type".
- Harry Powers was a serial killer of five victims, active 1927–1931.
- Nannie Doss was a serial killer of 11 victims, active 1927–1954.
- Raymond Fernandez and Martha Beck, dubbed the Lonely Hearts Killers, were a serial killer couple suspected of up to 20 victims, active 1947–1949.
- Harvey Glatman, known as the Lonely Hearts Killer and the Glamour Girl Slayer, was an American serial killer with 3-4 victims, active 1957–1958.

== See also ==
- Missed connection
