= Johann Otto Hoch =

German-born American murderer (1855-1906)

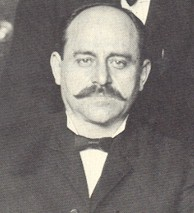
- Born: John Schmidt; 1855; Horrweiler, Grand Duchy of Hesse
- Died: February 23, 1906 (aged 50/51); Chicago, Illinois, U.S.
- Other names: The Bluebeard Murderer; C.A.Meyer; H. Ireck; Dr James; Jacob Huff; C.A.Calford; Jacob Hoch; Jacob Erdorff; Schmitt; Bartell; Henry F. Hartman; William Frederick Bessing; Martin Dotz; Adolf Hoch; Martin Dose; Albert Buschberg; John Healey; Carl Schmidt; Count Otto van Kurn; Dr G. L. Hart; John Jacob Leo Schmidt; Leo Preger; Joseph Hoch; Jacob Hock; Henry Bartells; John Joseph Adolf Hoch; Fred Doess
- Status: Executed by hanging
- Conviction: Murder
- Penalty: Death

Details
- Victims: 1–50+
- Span of crimes: 1890–1905
- Country: United States, Austria, France, United Kingdom
- States: Illinois, others possible
- Date apprehended: 1905

Johann Otto Hoch (also known as The Bluebeard Murderer and Chicago Bluebeard) (1855 – February 23, 1906) is the most famous and last-used alias of a German-born American murderer and bigamist, John Schmidt. He was found guilty of the murder of one wife but is thought to have killed more, perhaps up to fifty victims. He was executed by hanging in 1906.

== Early life ==
Hoch was born John Schmidt in 1855, at Horrweiler, in the Grand Duchy of Hesse (present-day Rhineland-Palatinate, Germany). He emigrated to the United States in the 1890s and dropped his surname in favor of assorted pseudonyms where he began to marry a string of women, frequently taking the name of his most recent victim. Hoch used matrimonial ads to find victims. He would swindle all their money and either leave them or kill them with arsenic and then repeat the pattern.

Chicago police would dub him "America’s greatest mass murderer", but statistics remain vague in the case. We know that Hoch bigamously married at least 55 women between 1890 and 1905, bilking all of them for cash and slaying many, but the final number of murder victims is a matter of conjecture.

Sensational reports credit Hoch with 25 to 50 murders, but police were only certain of 15, and in the end he went to trial (and to the gallows) for a single homicide. Hoch's first and only legal wife was Christine Ramb, who bore him three children before he deserted her in 1887.

== Timeline of swindles/killings ==
A turn of the century account partially reports on many of Hoch's victims, except where noted:

- 1881, Austria – marries Annie Hock {alleged}
- 1883, New York – Hoch arrives with wife Annie, an invalid who dies several years later {alleged}
- 1888, New York – After arriving from Wurtemberg, Hoch said to have married an immigrant servant girl who "died" prior to two months passing {alleged}. At the time of his 1905 New York arrest it was also alleged Hoch had married and either left/killed women in Vienna, Austria; London, England and Paris, France.
- 1891, Chicago - June: Hoch under name "Hoyle Frick" furnishes an apartment with $115
- 1892, Chicago – Mrs. Hoyle Frick dies {alleged}
- 1892, Chicago – May: Hoch under name "C.A. Meyer" rents flat with his new wife (who reportedly died after three weeks) {alleged}
- 1892, Chicago – June: Hoch under name "H. Irick" rents flat with his new wife (who reportedly died a month later) {alleged}
- 1893, Milwaukee – Hoch under name "Dr. James" marries Lena Schmitz (who died) {alleged}
- 1893, Milwaukee – Hoch marries Lena Schmitz's sister Clara (died) {alleged}
- 1894, Chicago – Under a new alias Hoch rents flat with a new wife (wife reportedly died after two months) {alleged}
- 1894, Chicago - Hoch under name "Jacob Erdorf", marries Mrs. Martha Hertzfeldt; she withdraws $1,800 of her own money and $800 of her sisters money and gives it to Hoch
- 1895, Chicago – Hoch is arrested while using the alias "C.A. Calford" and charged by Mrs. Janet Spencer with having eloped; married and deserted her with a few hundred dollars of her money; he is identified as the abductor of a Hulda Stevans and as a participant in a diamond robbery {alleged}
- 1895, Chicago - April: Under the name "Jacob Huff", Hoch marries Karoline/Caroline Miller, a widow from Wheeling, WV. She died June 15, 1895. He faked his death, took her surname Hoch and went to Chicago.
- 1895, Chicago - July 5: Arrives back in Chicago
- 1895, Chicago - July 15: Buys a saloon
- 1895, Chicago - August 5: Jacob Hoch he marries Mrs. Maria Steimbucher, she dies four months later; Hoch sold property for $4,000. Before dying she makes declaration that she has been poisoned but no notice is taken of her statement.
- 1895, Chicago - November: Hoch marries Mary Rankin; Hoch disappeared with her money the next day. {It is also alleged that about 1895 Hoch a.k.a. Schmidt went back to Germany but fled from a warrant charging that he was not only bankrupt but also owed 3,000 Marks}
- 1896, Chicago - April: Hoch under name "Jacob Erdorf" marries Maria Hartzfield; Hoch disappeared with $600 of her money after four months.
- 1896, San Francisco - September 22: Hoch a.k.a. "Schmitt" marries widow Barbara Brossett. "Schmitt" disappeared 2 days later with $1,465 of her money; she is so affected by the losses, she dies afterward.
- 1896, San Francisco: Hoch proposes to landlady Mrs H. Tanner, who refuses him.
- 1896, Cincinnati - November: Hoch marries Clara Bartel of Cincinnati, Ohio; she dies three months later.
- 1896, Baltimore: A Mrs. Henry Bartel dies in Baltimore {Bartel being a Hoch alias. It is also alleged that Hoch married two other times in Baltimore: a Mrs. Nannie Klenke-Schultz; Mrs. Henrietts Brooks-Schultz; an unnamed Boston woman married to a "Louis/Charles Bartels" came to Baltimore and seized his furniture}
- 1897, Cincinnati - January: Marries Julia Dose of Hamilton, Ohio; Hoch disappears same day with $700 of her money.
- 1897, Chicago - February: Hoch aka "Warneke" married Minnie Rankin,
- 1897, Cincinnati - March: Hoch aka "DeWitt C. Cudney" married Callie Charlotte Andrews; 2 hours later "Cudney" disappears with $500
- 1897, Cincinnati - July 20: Hoch a.k.a. "Henry F. Hartman" marries in Cincinnati {alleged}
- 1897, Williamsburg - December 6: Hoch marries a woman in Williamsburg New York and disappears with $200 {alleged}
- 1898, Jersey City - January 16: Hoch a.k.a. "William Frederick Bessing" marries Mrs. Winnie Westphal in Jersey City-Hoch disappears with $900.00 {alleged}
- 1898, Buffalo, NY: a Mrs. Wilhelmina Hoch dies {alleged}
- 1898, Chicago - March: Hoch appears a.k.a. "Martiz Dotz" with a wife who died June 1898 {alleged}.
- 1898, Chicago - June: Hoch a.k.a. "Adolf Hoch" a.k.a. "Martin Dose" arrested Chicago for selling already mortgaged furniture; gets one year in jail.
- 1899, Milwaukee: Hoch marries an unnamed sister of Mrs J.H. Schwartz-Marue; bride dies and Hoch disappears with $1,200 {alleged}
- 1899, Norfolk, Va: A Mrs Hoch died suddenly {alleged}
- 1900, Indiana: Allegedly married a Mary Hendrickson
- 1900, Indiana: Hoch a.k.a. "Albert Buschberg" married Mary Schultz of Argos, Indiana; Schultz, her 15-year-old daughter Nettie and $2,000 "disappeared".
- 1900, Chicago: A "Jacob Hoch" married Anna Scheffries (LDS record).
- 1900, Chicago - December 12: Hoch a.k.a. "John Healy" marries Amelia Hohn of Chicago; deserts her after getting $100.
- 1901, Columbus - January: Hoch a.k.a. "Carl Schmidt" marries in Columbus, Ohio; after two weeks he deserts her-along with $400.
- 1901, San Francisco: Hoch marries Mrs. Loughken-Hoch in San Francisco; she dies "suddenly"
- 1901, St. Louis - November: Hoch marries Anna Goehrke; he deserts her.
- 1902, St. Louis - April 8: Marries Mrs Mary Becker of St Louis; she dies in 1903
- 1902, May: Hoch a.k.a. "Count Otto van Kern" marries Mrs Hulda Nagel; husband persuaded wife to convert real estate into cash; while wife is shopping, her trunk containing $3,000 is robbed on contents and "Kern" deserts wife
- 1903, June 18: Hoch a.k.a. "Dr. G.L.Hart" flees after trying to poison Mabel Leichmann-a bride of three days; Hoch flees with $300 worth of diamonds and $200 of her money {alleged}
- 1903, Dayton Ohio: Hoch marries Mrs Annie Dodd {deserts her}
- 1903, Dayton Ohio: Hoch marries Mrs Regina Miller Curtis (deserts her)
- 1903, Milwaukee: Hoch courts Ida Zazuil but leaves her after a quarrel
- 1903, December: Hoch uses marriage license for Zazuil engagement and marries Mrs. T.O'Conner of Milwaukee-deserts her and absconds with $200 of her money {alleged}
- 1904, Hammond - January 2: A.k.a. "John Jacob Adolf Schmidt" marries Mrs Anna Hendrickson of Chicago in Hammond Indiana, and disappears January 20 with $500 of her money.
- 1904, Milwaukee - June: Hoch marries Lena Hoch of Milwaukee; she dies three weeks later leaving Hoch $1,500.
- 1904, South Haven-Michigan - September 21: "Jane Doe" young woman body washes ashore; has ring with the initials "R.K"-wife of Hoch? {alleged}
- 1904, Chicago - October 8: Hoch alias "Leo Prager" marries Bertha Dolder of Chicago-he disappears after buying $1,200 of rugs from $3,500 she gives him for a furniture store.
- 1904, Philadelphia - October 20: Hoch alias "John Schmidt" marries Caroline Streicher of Philadelphia-he disappears October 31, 1904.
- 1904, Chicago - November 9: Hoch appears in Chicago.
- 1904, Chicago - November 16: Hoch alias "Joseph Hoch" leases a cottage from a bank from November 16, 1904, to January 1, 1905; buys $120 worth of furniture.
- 1904, Chicago - December 10: Marries Marie Walcker of Chicago-who sells her candy store for $75.00 and gives Hoch her life savings of $350.
- 1904, Chicago - December 20: Marie Walcker becomes ill.
- 1905, Chicago - January 12: Marie Walcker-Hoch dies.
- 1905, Joliet, IL - January 15: Hoch marries Marie's sister Mrs. Emile Fischer in Joliet Ill, who gives Hoch $750 [$500{?}; Hoch leaves after Mrs. Fischer sister denounces Hoch as a murderer and swindler. NOTE: Hoch married Fischer under the alias of John "Hock"; he is also alleged to have married; swindled and desertered Anna Frederickson in 1904
- 1905, New York, NY - January 30: Hoch alias "Harry Bartells" proposes to his landlady Mrs. Catherine Kimmerle of New York City; she refuses and Hoch is arrested; Hoch claims alias of "John Joseph Adolf Hoch."
- 1905, February 1: Two indictments returned against Hoch for bigamy; alleged number of wives to be twenty-nine.
- 1905, February 5: Five more alleged wives of Hoch identify him
- 1905 May 19: Hoch tried and found guilty of murder of Marie Walcker; sentenced to death June 23, 1905. When the verdict was read in court, Hoch turned pale, stared hopelessly at the jurors, and sank limp in his chair; upon learning the sentence recommended was death, he told a prison guard he preferred the death penalty to life imprisonment, saying "it is all over with me and I hope that no time will be lost in taking me to the gallows."
- 1905, Chicago - June 23: Cora Wilson advances money so Hoch can appeal sentence to Illinois Supreme Court, which sustains lower court and sets execution date for August 25, 1905.
- 1905, Chicago - June 24: Hoch's 44th "wife" Mrs. Emile Fischer tries to save Hoch from the gallows.
- 1905 August 25 – Hoch's execution, scheduled for August 25, was stayed on August 24 when Justice Magruder of the Illinois Supreme Court issued a supersedeas after finding sufficient doubt in the record to justify a full review; the case was referred to the October term of the court at Springfield.
- 1905, Chicago - December 16 – Illinois Supreme Court refuses to intervene.
- 1906, Chicago - February 23 – Hoch is hanged.

== Other reported victims ==
In addition to the above, it is alleged that Hoch was involved with a Mrs. John Hicks of Wheeling WV {died}; Mrs. Emma Rencke of Chicago, IL; Mrs. Palinka of Batavia, IL; a Mrs. Fink of Aurora, IL; Natalie Irgang; Hulda Stevens; Schwatzman of Milwaukee, WI; and a Justina Loeffler of Elkhart Indiana who "disappeared" in Chicago in 1903.; a Mrs. Lena Hoch died in Milwaukee, WI in 1897; a Mrs. Hoch died 1897 and a Mrs. Hoch died 1898 – both sisters of Mrs. J.H.H. Schwartman of Milwaukee.
Allegedly Hoch married twice in Cincinnati, OH under alias of "Henry Bartel" and "Fred Doess".

== See also ==
- List of serial killers nicknamed "Bluebeard"
- List of serial killers in the United States
- List of homicides in Illinois
