= The Hobby Directory =

American periodical

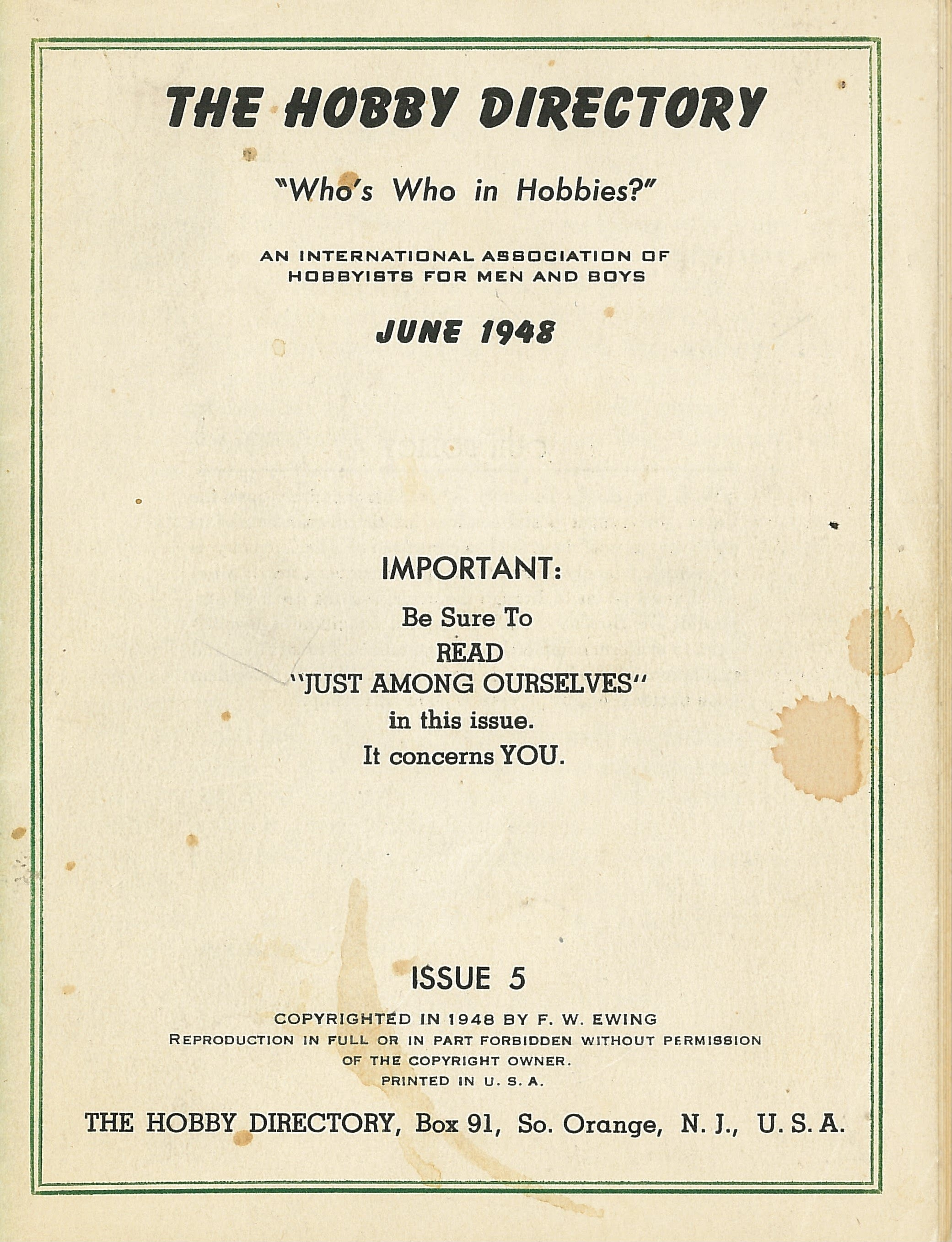
- The cover of a 1948 issue of The Hobby Directory
- Editor: F. W. Ewing
- First issue: 1946
- Final issue: circa 1952
- Based in: South Orange, New Jersey

The Hobby Directory was an American periodical published by Francis Willard Ewing from 1947 until the early 1950s. Ewing intended to connect black men and boys with shared interests and to unite them under one common goal: to reduce the prejudice they faced and to end the era when slave owners called their slaves "negro." Its audience came to include a significant number of gay men, who used the magazine to post covert personal advertisements at a time when homosexuality was socially taboo and legally proscribed.

== Publication history ==
The Hobby Directory was founded in 1946 by Francis Willard Ewing (1896–1984), a New Jersey high school teacher. It was the official publication of the National Association of Hobbyists for Men and Boys. The Hobby Directory was sold openly, including at craft stores. In addition, classified advertisements soliciting subscribers appeared in the national magazines Popular Mechanics and Popular Science, the latter directed to "men and boys only."

According to the copyright registration filed with the United States Copyright Office, the publication initially appeared twice a year, in June or July and in December. The run held by the GLBT Historical Society suggests the magazine later appeared quarterly and continued publishing until at least March 1952. The March 1952 issue is likewise the final one registered with the Copyright Office.

Historian David K. Johnson speculates that the magazine may have ceased publication following a "police crackdown" at a time when U.S. authorities were vigorously enforcing the Comstock laws, which prohibited sending obscene material through the mail.

== Contents ==
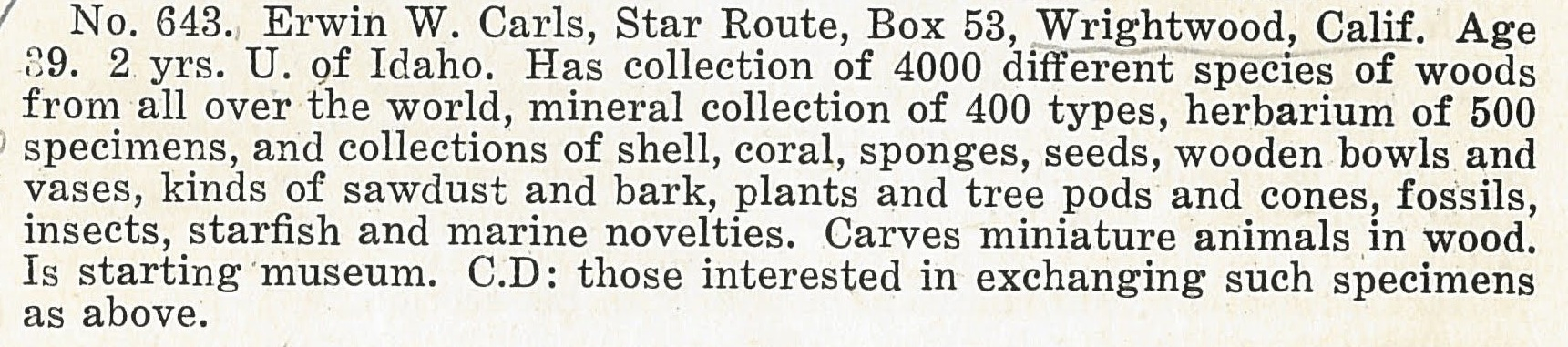
An advertisement written by a 39-year-old man with an interest in collecting wood, minerals, and other natural specimens.

The Directory described its mission as being "to help its members find hobby friends". The typewritten magazine consisted entirely of classified ads. In a typical ad, members would list their age, location, occupation, and hobbies or interests, such as model trains, particular genres of music, or rock collecting. Members would also indicate what sort of correspondence they sought from others using the initialism "C.D." for "Contacts Desired".

== Gay audience ==
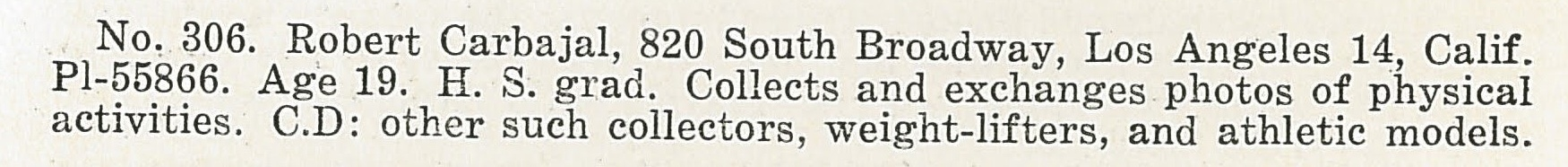
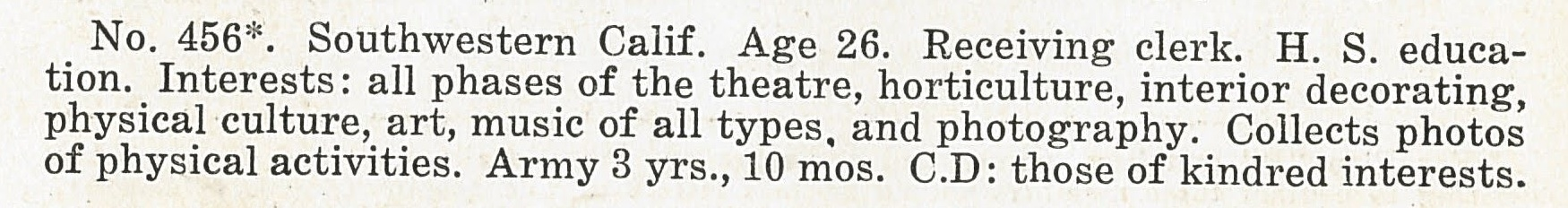
Two advertisements from a 1948 issue which both reference collecting "photos of physical activities". Such phrases were recognizable as discreet indicators of homosexuality.

The magazine was notably used by gay men seeking to connect with other gay men, to the point that writer Daniel Harris describes it as "little more than a bizarre dating service".

At the time of The Hobby Directory's publication, the ability of gay men in the US to express their sexuality was extremely limited. Prior to the 1958 Supreme Court case One, Inc. v. Olesen, writing on homosexuality was liable to be classified as obscene, and the transmission of such materials through the postal system was vigorously policed by the US Postal Service, enforcing the Comstock laws. The first enduring gay membership organization, the Mattachine Society, was not founded until 1950. Some gay men formed clandestine communities centered around certain bars, bathhouses, and public meeting places, though they risked police raids, and this option was foreclosed to men living in rural areas.

Unable to advertise their desires openly, many gay men turned to classified ads in publications such as The Hobby Directory, signaling to other gay men using coded references to interests such as physical culture, sunbathing, ballet, or wrestling. Another potential signal were professions suggestive of "gender inversion" such as florist, nurse, or hairdresser. Scholar William Leap suggests that such ads would not have been likely to arouse suspicion in an average reader because they made use of "familiar words and phrases" rather than any peculiar secret codes.

It is unknown whether Ewing intended to cater to gay men, or the degree to which he was aware of the magazine's large gay audience. Michael Waters notes that Ewing apparently had a genuine zeal for hobbies, given that, more than a decade before the magazine's debut, he had founded a student hobbyist club at the high school at which he taught. As evidence of Ewing's complicity, some scholars have pointed to a notice printed by Ewing in a 1951 issue in which he chastised members for lying about their age, deceiving younger members who wished to correspond only with members of similar ages for purposes such as sharing "photos of young men in service uniforms" or "memorabilia related to boys famous in history".

The proportion of gay-coded advertisements appears to have increased over the span of the magazine's existence. David K. Johnson views later issues of The Hobby Directory as increasingly coming to resemble the physique magazines which were becoming increasingly popular among gay men. Later issues of the Directory would include photos of members, and "cover art featuring naked boys seen from behind".

== Scarcity ==
The only known surviving issues of The Hobby Directory are preserved in the holdings of the GLBT Historical Society in San Francisco. The collection, consisting of 24 issues ranging from July 1946 to March 1952, came to the institution's archives as part of the papers of Bois Burk (1906–1993). A gay man who served as one of Alfred Kinsey's research informants, Burk marked up some of his copies of the magazine with notes regarding his contacts with men who had placed personal advertisements.
