= Helmuth Schmidt =

American bigamist and suspected serial killer

- Born: July 4, 1876; Rostock, Grand Duchy of Mecklenburg-Schwerin, German Empire
- Died: April 23, 1918 (aged 41); Detroit, Michigan, U.S.
- Cause of death: Suicide by crushing his own head with a bed
- Other names: "The American Bluebeard" "The German Bluebeard"; Emil Brown; Emil Braun; Herman Neugebauer; John Switt
- Conviction: Died before trial

Details
- Victims: 2–4+
- Span of crimes: 1913–1917
- Country: United States
- States: New Jersey, Michigan, New York, Missouri
- Date apprehended: April 22, 1918

Helmuth Schmidt (July 4, 1876 – April 23, 1918), also known as The American Bluebeard, was a German-born American bigamist, murderer and suspected serial killer. Soon following his arrest in connection with the murder of maid Augusta Steinbach, Schmidt committed suicide in his jail cell. After searching through his properties, he was connected to the murders of three more women, with additional located jewelry and watches indicating possible other victims in New York and Missouri.

== Biography ==
=== Early life ===
Born as the illegitimate son of a Prussian junker, Schmidt was reportedly educated in Heidelberg, and often engaged in duels, resulting in several scars on his face. He escaped military service by moving to America, arriving in Lakewood Township, New Jersey with his wife Anita Darsch and daughter Gertrude in 1913, under the name of Emil Braun. He opened a small jewelry shop in the town and established his home in a small rented cottage. Shortly after his arrival, his wife disappeared. Helmuth claimed that she had returned to Berlin, along with the female servant Margaret "Greta" Darsch, with whom he had a love affair. When Darsch vanished, Schmidt explained to his daughter that she had married and travelled to Denmark.

Schmidt later married Adele Ulrich from New York through a matrimonial advertisement, buying a house using her money. He later abandoned Ulrich and left Lakewood in 1914, after collecting $1,500 by fraudulently selling his home. When she was later questioned, Ulrich revealed that on one night, he tried to kill her by ramming their automobile into a tree. She was thrown out of the car, and while lying on the ground, Schmidt began savagely beating her. Ulrich was barely saved, as at that moment a car passed by them. She later told of the event to the attending physician, who threatened to have Schmidt arrested if she were to disappear. Not only that, but Ulrich also informed the police of another time when he flew into a violent rage with threats of taking her life, as a result of her inquiry about why the old well in the house wasn't used.

From there, Schmidt moved to Royal Oak, Michigan, assuming the name of Herman Neugebauer and finding himself work as a mechanic in one of the local Ford factories.

=== Murder of Steinbach and suicide ===
In 1916, with the help of George Rolfe and his wife, Schmidt put out two matrimonial ads in the New York Herald, one under his assumed name of Neugebauer. These ads attracted the attention of 40-year-old domestic servant Augusta Steinbach, who, after corresponding with Rolfe for a few months, set out to marry the mysterious man, bringing with herself around $500 and some jewelry. In February 1917, she told her long-time friend and fellow servant Agnes Domanie about her intentions to marry the man in Detroit, departing to the city in March. A few days after she left, she wrote to Ms. Domanie, describing enthusiastically her husband-to-be, as well as asking her friend to send three trunks of clothes stored in a nearby warehouse. Domanie complied with the request, but three months later, her package was returned by the company, with them explaining that they couldn't locate Augusta Steinbach.

Following this, Ms. Domanie wrote to the authorities in Detroit. Three months after her request, she was visited by Sheriff O. H. P. Green who spoke with her, but failed to locate Steinbach. He soon committed suicide, burning all papers related to the case. Despite this, Ms. Domanie continued to insist on the police listening to her. Eventually, Glen Gillespie, the District Attorney of Oakland County, came to visit her. After carefully examining the case, he located the elusive man from the ads: Helmuth Schmidt. Upon his arrest, Helmuth confessed that he had burned Steinbach's body, but alleged that she had killed herself with poison following his refusal to instantly marry her and a subsequent quarrel on March 11. Fearing that his wife and daughter would return soon from the cinema, Schmidt dragged the body to the cellar, lifted it through a window and then buried it under his porch. Three months after the incident, he claimed that he dug up the body, cut it up with a cleaver and then burned the pieces in the furnace.

However, the family's strange actions were recalled by suspicious neighbors who thought they were German spies or murderers. On the night that Steinbach had disappeared, a woman's shrieks were heard from the Schmidt household, and soon after, a huge fire was lit in their furnace. The fire was so furious, that smoke and sparks were reported as coming out of the chimney. The following morning, Mrs. Schmidt was seen carrying a pan full of ashes and other matter, which she dumped into a small stream.

After his confession, the authorities decided to go for a lunch break. However, ten minutes later, a large crash was heard from the cell area. Schmidt had crawled under his bed, lifted it and then dropped it on his head, crushing his skull. His funeral was later attended only by his former wife, Adele Ulrich.

=== Investigation ===
Despite Schmidt's death, the police continued to investigate the deceased's history, discovering several other previous marriages, along with other women who've gone missing who had connections to him. Among them were the following:

- Mrs. John Switt of New York - claimed that Schmidt had married her under the name John Switt in 1914.
- Mrs. Emil Brown of New York - a stenographer for the Hupfel Brewing Company, married Schmidt in 1915 at Lakewood; on April 26, 1918, she claimed he had stolen $3,500 from her
- Irma Pallatinus - housekeeper; accompanied him from Lakewood to Detroit in 1915, "disappeared" soon after.
- Mrs. Helmuth Schmidt of Chicago - she married him in 1916, after which he robbed her of $2,000 and then deserted; On May 9, 1918, when she was later shown a picture of him, she identified Schmidt as her husband.

According to the authorities, Schmidt planned to accumulate money in order to return to Germany, where he would live as an aristocrat. Not only that, but one of his former wives, Adele Ulrich, also alleged that he was a German spy, tasked with making sketches of fortifications in New York's harbor.

County authorities continued investigating Schmidt's properties, planning to excavate several places in them. Among them was the abandoned well, in which prosecutor Richard Plumer believed lay the bodies of both Anita Schmidt and Greta Darsch. However, a kitchen had been built over it, so the authorities would have to excavate it. Aside from the well, the floor of the barn and an entire cement floor from the cellar would also be removed.

=== Discovery of body ===
Under the direction of Constable William T. Mason, a gang of men was mobilized to search the Schmidt household in Lakewood, but nothing was found that could shed light on the disappearances. The search party then attempted to examine the well using grappling hooks, but they got caught up at the bottom of the well, postponing the investigation until the next day. The barn was later examined, but it was determined through the undisturbed soil that nobody had been buried at that location. Despite this, Prosecutor Gillespie wrote to Mr. Plumer, detailing the house and suggesting possible hiding spaces for where the bodies could be.

The following day, a diver was sent in to investigate the well, an event which gathered a large crowd. Eventually, one of the hooks caught on to something that refused to budge, further increasing the crowd's excitement. The diver gave a little slack to his rope and jerked it quickly, with the resulting sound making it clear that there was nothing more than metallic structures at the bottom. After this discovery, Prosecutor Plumer set his eyes on a garage which was on the property.

Soon after the officials gave up on excavating the property, a workman throwing up his last shovel of dirt uncovered a body wrapped up in a canvas under the cemented floor of the garage. The body was later identified as that of Irma Pallatinus by her sister, Mrs. Edward Rederer, using a strand of her hair. Further examination revealed that she had been strangled with a clothes line.

While discussing the case, Adele Ulrich noted that Schmidt had allowed her to take a small peek into the cellar, where she later alleged the authorities would most likely find the bodies of Anita Schmidt and Greta Darsch.

== See also ==
- List of serial killers nicknamed "Bluebeard"
- List of serial killers in the United States

== Bibliography ==
- Tobin T. Buhk (July 2, 2013). The Shocking Story of Helmuth Schmidt: Michigan's Original Lonely-Hearts Killer. History Press. ISBN 978-1626190177.
- Gini Graham Scott (2007). American Murder: Homicide in the early 20th century. Bloomsbury Academic. ISBN 978-0275999773.
