= Clara Green Carl =

American writer and murderer

Clara Carl
- Born: Clara Elenore Green; May 7, 1876; Ward Township, Hocking, Ohio
- Died: March 3, 1962 (aged 85); Canton, Ohio
- Other names: Clara Gibson, Clara Winters
- Occupation: Writer
- Known for: Murder for profit

Clara Elenore Carl (née Green; May 7, 1876 – March 3, 1962) was an American writer and suspected serial killer. In 1922, she was convicted of poisoning her second husband, Frank Emmerson Carl, and his father, Alonzo Carl. She was sentenced to life imprisonment but paroled after 15 years. During her time in prison she escaped once and evaded recapture for a week. It is suspected that she also killed her first husband, Robert Gibson. She was "considered one of the most daring woman criminals in the country," earning the nickname "feminine Bluebeard."

== Biography ==
Green was born in Ohio to John Green, a farmer, and Phoebe Malinda Hill. On January 2, 1897, she married her childhood sweetheart, Robert Matthew Gibson, in Ohio. However they married again on March 14, 1908, at Covington, Kentucky.

They moved to Cleveland, where he worked as a teacher while she became a writer for a newspaper. The couple came up with a get-rich-quick scheme where they travelled from town to town, writing and selling books of local historic areas. Their plan failed. While in Huntsville, Missouri, Gibson became ill with what was assumed to be influenza. He died March 18, 1920, leaving Clara a widow and the sole beneficiary of a $3,000 life insurance policy (equivalent to $48,000 in 2025).

A few months after her first husband's death, Green met and married Frank Carl on September 14, 1920, with the impression that he was wealthy. This was a tumultuous relationship, and at one point Carl filed a complaint for divorce against her husband in the Hancock Circuit Court. When asked by Lizzie Maynard what her grounds for divorce were, Clara replied that "if the law did not provide a way there was always some way." In order to get her to drop the divorce lawsuit, Frank made her the sole beneficiary of his life insurance policy, worth $2,000. In 1921, Clara and Frank invited Frank's elderly father, Alonzo Carl, 85, to come live with them in Philadelphia, Indiana. According to Frank's brother, Herman Carl, his father was in good health when he went to live with the couple. Like Clara's first husband, Alonzo became gravely ill by an unknown illness and died in August 1921. Expecting property from her father-in-law, Clara was furious to find that it had been given to her husband's brother-in-law Dr. Iles. Two months later, Frank was dead, suffering the same illness, with his death certificate stating he died of a high fever caused by cirrhosis of the liver. The day after her husband's funeral, Clara asked Herman to meet with her to discuss obtaining Alonzo's property from Dr. Iles. Her suspicious actions aroused skepticism among her neighbors who demanded an investigation. Frank and Alonzo's bodies were exhumed, revealing that each man had enough arsenic in his system "to kill a dozen men", according to the prosecutor." Clara was arrested and charged in January 1922.

During her trial, Rhoda Loehr testified that in July 1921, Clara bought arsenic citing that "neighborhood cats had been stealing her chickens [and] she said she wanted to kill the cats." Evidence of arsenic in her second husband and father-in-law revealed this to be true. An investigation into her first husband's death revealed the same results. Clara was found guilty of second-degree murder and sentenced to life in prison at the Indiana Women's Prison at Indianapolis. She was "considered one of the most daring woman criminals in the country" earning the nickname "feminine Bluebeard."

While in prison, Clara made a daring and cunning escape in early October 1925. She was assigned outdoor work due to ill health and became a trusty, earning the trust of prison guards after three years of good behavior. Clara was assigned to feeding the prison-yard chickens. One evening, she climbed up one of the chicken coops, hopped the prison wall and escaped. She evaded police for about a week before her re-capture. At aged 54, Clara was paroled on May 26, 1937, 15 years after she was convicted of murder.

In 1946, under the alias Clara Garnagan, the 60 year old married for a third time to Robert H. Winters. She died at a nursing home in Canton, Ohio, aged 85.

== See also ==
- List of serial killers nicknamed "Bluebeard"
