= Alfred Leonard Cline =

Alleged American serial killer

- Born: March 12, 1888; Frederick, Kansas, U.S.
- Died: August 5, 1948 (aged 60); Folsom Prison, Folsom, California, U.S.
- Other name: "The Buttermilk Bluebeard"
- Conviction: Forgery (9 counts)
- Penalty: 126 years imprisonment

Details
- Victims: 0–9
- Span of crimes: 1930–1945
- Country: United States
- States: California, Nevada, Texas, Massachusetts, Colorado
- Date apprehended: 1945

Alfred Leonard Cline (March 12, 1888 – August 5, 1948), known as The Buttermilk Bluebeard, was an alleged American serial killer responsible for murdering at least nine people.

== Biography ==
Cline was born on March 12, 1888, in Frederick, Kansas. He was never convicted of murders, as no supporting evidence was found. He married women of status, convinced them to will their possessions to his name, and persuaded them to drink a glass of poisoned buttermilk that contained powerful sedatives. After a fatal dose of drugs, a local doctor would issue a death certificate citing the cause of death to be heart failure.

Cline cremated his later wives to hide any evidence of murder. He acquired over $82,000 in possessions from eight of his wives. Cline was prosecuted for a murder charge, but jailed for forgery. He was sentenced to 126 years in Folsom Prison, California for 9 counts for forgery. Cline died of a heart attack in the prison on August 5, 1948.

== See also ==
- List of serial killers nicknamed "Bluebeard"
- List of serial killers in the United States
