= Arwed Imiela =

German serial killer (1929–1982)

- Born: Arwed Erich Imiela; October 7, 1929; Schlawe, Free State of Prussia (present-day Sławno, Poland)
- Died: June 3, 1982 (aged 52); Fuhlsbüttel, Hamburg, West Germany
- Other names: "The Bluebeard of Fehmarn" "The Bluebeard from Holiday Island"; Detlev-Klaus Holm-Menhardt
- Conviction: Murder x4
- Penalty: Life imprisonment x4

Details
- Victims: 4
- Span of crimes: 1968–1969
- Country: West Germany
- State: Schleswig-Holstein
- Date apprehended: April 23, 1970

Arwed Erich Imiela (October 7, 1929 – June 3, 1982), known as The Bluebeard of Fehmarn (German: Der Blaubart von Fehmarn), was a German serial killer who killed four women for monetary purposes in Fehmarn from 1968 to 1969. While he insisted on his innocence, Imiela would later be convicted of all the killings and sentenced to life imprisonment, dying in prison in 1982.

== Early life ==
Arwed Erich Imiela was born on October 7, 1929, in Schlawe. In 1936, his parents divorced, forcing the young boy to commute between school in Köslin and his administration apprenticeship in Berlin. His mother, who forbade him from going to grammar school despite his father's protests to this decision, later remarried, but Imiela had a poor relationship with his violent stepfather. Imiela would later claim that his stepfather gave preferential to his sister and was physically abusive towards him. Shortly before the end of the Second World War, Imiela was sent to a military training camp and later to a German labour camp. He managed to escape after a year and alternated between visiting his mother and father, but was eventually thrown out.

After the end of the war, Imiela was released and began to earn a living on the black market as an actor and journalist. While browsing a black market in Düsseldorf, he came across some forged papers and decided to adopt a new identity. Calling himself "Detlev-Klaus Holm-Menhardt", he presented himself as a junior teacher with an abitur, and that he was eight years older than his actual age. At the time of the currency reform in Germany, Imiela found himself without any money, and asked to be housed in by a friend living in Marsberg. He later married his friend's 15-year-old pregnant sister, and made a living through unskilled labour. After a year and a half, his marriage ended in divorce, but not long after, Imiela, still presenting himself as Holm-Menhardt, met and married Ilse Müssener.

Following their marriage, Imiela attempted to become a writer, but later opened a company in the early 1950s. In 1952, he was arrested for fraud and sentenced to a 2-year prison term. While in prison, he took an interest in astrology, passing an exam at the German Astrologers Association and referring to himself as a "qualified astrologer". Utilising his newfound interest, he began producing mass horoscopes using a typewriter, which he later sold. Through this activity, he would later meet his first victims.

== Murders ==
In 1967, after seventeen years of marriage, Imiela left his second wife Ilse, claiming that he needed "to be alone and lead his life alone, at least for a while". Through his horoscope-selling services, he befriended 47-year-old Annemarie Schröder, the wife of a Frankfurt merchant, to whom he acted as a life coach for a monthly salary of 2,500 Marks. Eventually, Imiela was allowed to live in her rented villa in Marienleuchte, on the island of Fehmarn, where Schröder would later move in with her 75-year-old mother, Anna-Maria Kieferle. The women vanished mysteriously circa December 1968, and have never been seen since.

In 1969, Imiela met 24-year-old Ulrike Roland at a party in Reinbek near Hamburg. Charmed by his polite and respectful manner, the pair soon married and she moved to live with him in his apartment. During this period, Ulrike claimed that he kept a picture of a blond woman in the living room, whom Imiela claimed was first wife, "Angélique", who had died in a car crash some years prior. He would often travel to various locations, including Italy and North Vietnam, but often kept the reasons for the travels secret. One day, Imiela decided to accompany his wife on a visit to her rich aunt, 47-year-old Ilse Evels, with whom he got acquainted after the elderly woman complained about some payment issues. After offering to help her, Imiela would occasionally visit Evels and her 20-year-old daughter Urte, taking the latter on hunting trips. By this time, Roland had noticed a change in both her fiancé and her cousin's behaviour, believing that Urte had developed a crush on Imiela.

In the autumn of 1969, Imiela abruptly ended his relationship with Ulrike, claiming that needed to go their separate ways. They officially divorced on December 17, 1969. Sometime after that, Ulrike went to pick up some of her belongings from the apartment in Reinbek, only to discover some of her aunt's belongings there. When pressed as to why he has them, Imiela claimed that he had bought them from Evels, who had gone on a trip together with Urte.

== Arrest, trial and imprisonment ==
Following the deaths of the Evelses, Imiela attempted to make a 150,000 Deutsche Mark transaction from Ilse's account. The bank employee overseeing Evels' bank account, Mr. Wabnitz, who had explicitly requested that she visit him in person, became suspicious of Imiela and notified authorities. On April 23, 1970, both he and his fiancée were arrested on suspicion of fraud, and a few days later, the bodies of the Evelses were found in a sludge pit near Imiela's bungalow in Fehmarn. Police later interviewed a gas station attendant, who claimed to have been hired by the property owner to dig the pit, ostensibly so he could store the carcasses of the animals he killed in hunts. Imiela was charged with the murders, but Ulrike was released after three weeks due to lack of evidence. He would later be connected to the disappearances of Schröder and Kieferle, but their bodies were never located.

Imiela's trial began on October 9, 1972, after spending more than two and a half years in pre-trial detention. On May 24, 1973, Imiela was convicted of the four murders on circumstantial evidence by the Lübeck district court, but he continued to proclaim his innocence. Imiela was sent to serve his sentence at a prison in Hamburg's Fuhlsbüttel Prison, where he died on June 3, 1982, from heart failure. His body was later anonymously interred at the Ohlsdorf Cemetery.

== See also ==
- List of serial killers nicknamed "Bluebeard"
- List of German serial killers

== Bibliography ==
- Helfried Spitra (2004). Die grossen Kriminalfälle: der St. Pauli-Killer, der Ausbrecherkönig und neun weitere berühmte Verbrechen [The big criminal cases: the St. Pauli Killer, the escape king and nine other famous cases] (in German). Campus Verlag. ISBN 3593374382.
- Nadine Witt (November 7, 2013). Der Blaubart von Fehmarn: Die Lebensgeschichte des Frauenmörders Arwed Imiela [The Bluebeard of Fehmarn: The Life Story of the Women-Killer Arwed Imiela] (in German). MAC. ISBN 978-3981537680.

== In the media and culture ==
- A 1995 made-for-TV film named Frauenmörder Arved Imiela, directed by Eberhard Itzenplitz, was based on Imiela's life, with Wolf Roth was cast to play as him.
- An episode for the fourth season of the documentary series Die großen Kriminalfälle, released June 16, 2004, examined Imiela's case.
- South African DJ, Sole, released a song named The 2 Faces of Arwed Imiela in 2012.
