= Alexey Gromov (serial killer) =

Convicted Russian serial killer

- Born: Alexey Vladimirovich Gromov; 1970 (age 55–56); Lyubim, Yaroslavl Oblast, RSFSR
- Other name: "The Bluebeard"
- Conviction: Murder x5
- Penalty: 10 years (first murder); Life imprisonment (later murders)

Details
- Victims: 5
- Span of crimes: 1994; 2006 – 2011
- Country: Russia
- States: Yaroslavl, Oryol
- Date apprehended: February 16, 2011

Alexey Vladimirovich Gromov (Russian: Алексей Владимирович Громов; born 1970), known as The Bluebeard (Russian: Синяя борода), is a Russian serial killer who killed three common-law wives and one of their mothers between 2006 and 2011, after being released for a previous murder in 1994 for which he served 10 years. For his later killings, Gromov was found guilty and sentenced to life imprisonment.

== Biography ==
Alexey Gromov, a native of Lyubim born in 1970, received his first prison sentence in 1994, when he was found guilty of killing his wife and sent off to prison to serve a 10-year sentence. He was paroled in 2002 and returned to Lyubim, where he soon entered a relationship with an 18-year-old girl.

Much to his dismay, the pair failed to get along and often quarreled, as Gromov complained that his common-law wife drank heavily. In June 2006, he decided that they would travel together to Tver Oblast, where he planned to leave her behind and return without her. However, when they arrived at the Pishchakino Railway Station in the Nekouzsky District, Gromov and his mistress began arguing, resulting in him beating her severely (with either brass knuckles or a hammer). The woman was left on the scene, where she succumbed to her injuries shortly after.

After this murder, Gromov moved to Yaroslavl. In 2007, he began courting 28-year-old Anastasia Levitskaya, a nurse for one of the local hospitals. According to friends and family, the couple got along well with one another, and had even planned to get officially married and have a child. However, one night in May 2008, while Gromov was visiting Levitskaya's apartment on Dobrolyubov Street, the pair got into an argument, during which Levitskaya was then struck on the head with a hammer and knocked out. To make sure that she was dead, Gromov proceeded to stab her in the chest with a scratch awl, killing her in the process. In order to hide the body, he moved the body to the bathroom and put in the bathtub, which he then filled up with water. After doing this, he took her cellphone and 6,000 rubles, and left the apartment.

Knowing that the authorities would likely catch him if he remained in Yaroslavl, Gromov hid from police for the next three years, alternating between Kursk, Tver and Oryol. While residing in Oryol, Gromov met a 27-year-old divorcée with whom he began a relationship. This didn't last long, however, as in February 2011, while he was visiting his concubine's home on Marinchenko Street, Gromov started an argument with her. In response, he grabbed a knife and stabbed the woman, as well as her 48-year-old mother, who was living with her. To make sure that both were dead, he then took an axe and struck them both with it, killing both women instantly. After killing his victims, Gromov then took his concubine's 4-year-old daughter and fled back to his parents' house in Lyubim, where he planned to lie low for a while. Despite his efforts, on February 16, 2011, he was arrested by special forces operatives who were investigating his crimes.

During the subsequent interrogations, Gromov confessed solely to the Levitskaya murder, but the authorities, unconvinced by his claims, investigated further, discovering that he had murdered three other women as well. After a psychiatric exam deduced that he was sane to stand trial, Gromov was charged with the four murders, with the court taking into account his previous murder conviction. During his trial, it was noted that he compared his crimes to war, where he considered women to be his "opponents". In the summer of 2012, he was found guilty on all charges and sentenced to life imprisonment. After his sentencing, Gromov was shipped off to an unspecified special regime colony.

== See also ==
- List of serial killers nicknamed "Bluebeard"
- List of Russian serial killers
