= Abbi Merriss =

American chef and restaurateur

Abbi Merriss is an American chef from Indianapolis. She was a James Beard award semifinalist in 2016, 2017, 2018, and 2019 and in February 2020 received her fifth nomination. Her restaurant, Bluebeard, was nominated for a Beard award for Best New Restaurant in America in 2012. She specializes in New American cuisine.

== Early life ==
Merriss was born in Evansville, Indiana, to Ramona Hamilton and Rick Merriss, one of three sisters and one brothers. Her parents separated when she was two. Her mother moved the family to Louisville, Kentucky, Daytona Beach, Florida, and Quincy, Illinois before resettling in Evansville when Merriss was in third grade. During this period her mother had multiple relationships, and the family spent time in a women's shelter. As a preteen Merriss made a video titled "Cooking with Abbi" in which she demonstrated how to make a cake from a boxed mix. As a teenager she was mentored by a woman whose family she was nannying for. At 15, she worked at a restaurant bussing tables.

== Career ==
In 2001, at 18, she graduated from high school and moved with a boyfriend to Portsmouth, Virginia where she got a job as counter help at the Top Ten Cafe in the Ghent historic neighborhood of nearby Norfolk, where in addition to taking orders she did food prep and eventually started creating dishes and managing the restaurant. She enjoyed the work and moved to another nearby restaurant, Cora, as a line cook. Her experience there included having a pickle thrown at her by the owner, who regularly became so angry she jumped up and down, causing Merriss to conclude that "Having tantrums is not a way to fix a problem. You fix a problem by communicating quickly and politely. You can have a tantrum later.”

In 2005, at 22, having broken up with the boyfriend, Merriss moved to Indianapolis to be closer to family. She got a job as a line cook at Elements working for Greg Hardesty. Hardesty, a five-time James Beard nominee, became a mentor and helped her get a scholarship to a local culinary school. She did internships in New York City, and when she returned to Indianapolis worked for Regina Mehallick at R Bistro, as Hardesty had closed Elements. She worked for Hardesty again as sous chef at a new restaurant, Recess, in Indianapolis's SoBro neighborhood. Recess offered a prix-fixe four-course menu that change daily, a new concept for Indianapolis at the time.

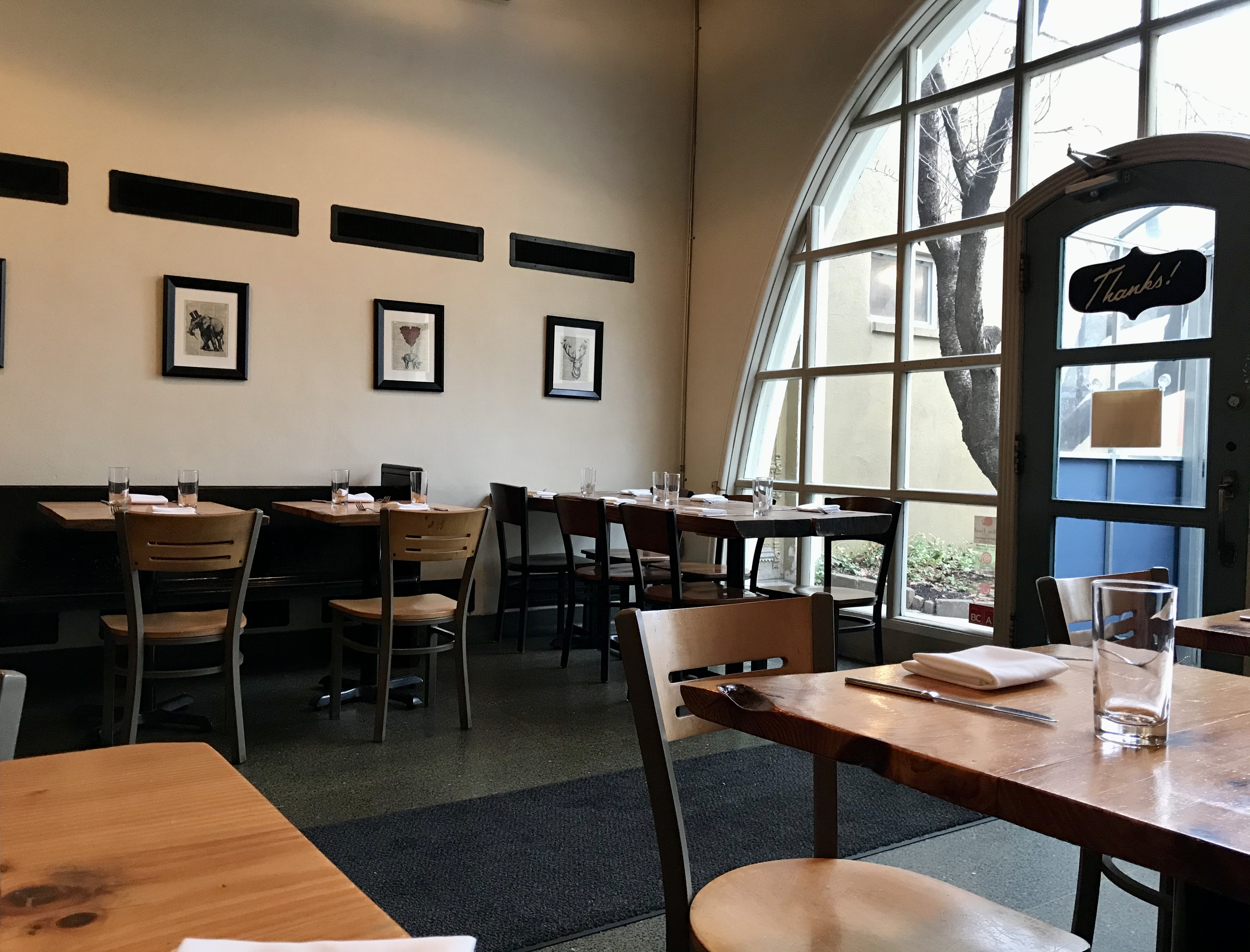
Interior of Bluebeard

Merriss opened Bluebeard, a gastropub serving New American cuisine, in 2012 with then-husband John Adams and partners Tom and Edward Battista. The restaurant is in the Fletcher Place historic district in a renovated warehouse built in 1924. It was named after Bluebeard, the 12th of Kurt Vonnegut's novels. Vonnegut was a native of Indianapolis. The restaurant's menu changes daily. The bar area has a "writerly esthetic," according to the Washington Post; Food Republic likened the dining room to a library. The restaurant's courtyard patio has been called the best in the city.

Merriss and the Battistas in 2019 planned a second restaurant, Kan-Kan Cinema and Brasserie, in Indianapolis's Windsor Park neighborhood, eventually announcing a 23 March 2020 opening date. The restaurant delayed its start due to the 2020 coronavirus pandemic.

Merriss is recognized for her interest in and expertise at mentoring young chefs.

== Reception ==
The Indianapolis Star called her a "major Indianapolis chef" when naming Kan-Kan as one of 2020's most exciting restaurant openings. Indianapolis Monthly said of her, "Perhaps more than anyone other than Milktooth and Beholder chef Jonathan Brooks, she’s responsible for Indy’s heightened profile among foodies in recent years" and previously, "There may be no one better in town than chef Abbi Merriss at delivering the classics while offering up seasonal surprises that are as daring as they are comforting." Food & Wine said she and Brooks were key to "one of the most exciting American food scenes." Condé Nast Traveler said that she and Holder "have redefined what it means to cook in the Corn Belt."

The New York Times called out dinner at Bluebeard in its travel feature "36 Hours in Indianapolis" and Thrillist recommended Bluebeard "if you have just one meal" in Indianapolis. New York called the restaurant "esteemed." In 2016 Business Insider named it the best restaurant in Indiana. Garden and Gun called her menu at Bluebeard a "love letter to brasserie comfort food".

== Honors ==
Merriss was a James Beard award semifinalist in 2016, 2017, 2018, and 2019. In February 2020 she received her fifth Beard nomination.

Bluebeard was nominated in 2012 for a James Beard Award for Best New Restaurant in America.

== Personal life ==
In 2012 Merriss married chef John Adams; they have since divorced.
