= List of Asparagales of South Africa =

List of flowering plants in the order Asparagales recorded from South Africa

Asparagales (asparagoid lilies) is an order of flowering plants (anthophytes) in modern classification systems such as the Angiosperm Phylogeny Group (APG) and the Angiosperm Phylogeny Web. The order takes its name from the type family Asparagaceae and is placed in the monocots amongst the lilioid monocots. The order has only recently been recognized in classification systems. It was first put forward by Huber in 1977 and later taken up in the Dahlgren system of 1985 and then the APG in 1998, 2003 and 2009. Before this, many of its families were assigned to the old order Liliales, a very large order containing almost all monocots with colorful tepals and lacking starch in their endosperm. DNA sequence analysis indicated that many of the taxa previously included in Liliales should actually be redistributed over three orders, Liliales, Asparagales, and Dioscoreales. The boundaries of the Asparagales and of its families have undergone a series of changes in recent years; future research may lead to further changes and ultimately greater stability. In the APG circumscription, Asparagales is the largest order of monocots with 14 families, 1,122 genera, and about 36,000 species.

The order is clearly circumscribed on the basis of molecular phylogenetics, but it is difficult to define morphologically since its members are structurally diverse. Most species of Asparagales are herbaceous perennials, although some are climbers and some are tree-like. The order also contains many geophytes (bulbs, corms, and various kinds of tuber). According to telomere sequence, at least two evolutionary switch-points happened within the order. One of the defining characteristics (synapomorphies) of the order is the presence of phytomelanin, a black pigment present in the seed coat, creating a dark crust. Phytomelanin is found in most families of the Asparagales (although not in Orchidaceae, thought to be the sister-group of the rest of the order). The leaves of almost all species form a tight rosette, either at the base of the plant or at the end of the stem, but occasionally along the stem. The flowers are not particularly distinctive, being 'lily type', with six tepals and up to six stamina. The order is thought to have first diverged from other related monocots some 120–130 million years ago (early in the Cretaceous period), although given the difficulty in classifying the families involved, estimates are likely to be uncertain.

From an economic point of view, the order Asparagales is second in importance within the monocots to the order Poales (which includes grasses and cereals). Some species are used as food and flavourings.

The anthophytes are a grouping of plant taxa bearing flower-like reproductive structures. They were formerly thought to be a clade comprising plants bearing flower-like structures. The group contained the angiosperms - the extant flowering plants, such as roses and grasses - as well as the Gnetales and the extinct Bennettitales.

23,420 species of vascular plant have been recorded in South Africa, making it the sixth most species-rich country in the world and the most species-rich country on the African continent. Of these, 153 species are considered to be threatened. Nine biomes have been described in South Africa: Fynbos, Succulent Karoo, desert, Nama Karoo, grassland, savanna, Albany thickets, the Indian Ocean coastal belt, and forests.

The 2018 South African National Biodiversity Institute's National Biodiversity Assessment plant checklist lists 35,130 taxa in the phyla Anthocerotophyta (hornworts (6)), Anthophyta (flowering plants (33534)), Bryophyta (mosses (685)), Cycadophyta (cycads (42)), Lycopodiophyta (Lycophytes(45)), Marchantiophyta (liverworts (376)), Pinophyta (conifers (33)), and Pteridophyta (cryptogams (408)).

14 families are represented in the literature. Listed taxa include species, subspecies, varieties, and forms as recorded, some of which have subsequently been allocated to other taxa as synonyms, in which cases the accepted taxon is appended to the listing. Multiple entries under alternative names reflect taxonomic revision over time.

== Agapanthaceae ==
Family Agapanthaceae,

=== Agapanthus ===
Genus Agapanthus:

- Agapanthus africanus (L.) Hoffmanns. endemic
  - Agapanthus africanus (L.) Hoffmanns. subsp. africanus, endemic
  - Agapanthus africanus (L.) Hoffmanns. subsp. walshii (L.Bolus) Zonn. & G.D.Duncan, accepted as Agapanthus walshii L.Bolus, endemic
- Agapanthus campanulatus F.M.Leight. indigenous
  - Agapanthus campanulatus F.M.Leight. subsp. campanulatus, indigenous
  - Agapanthus campanulatus F.M.Leight. subsp. patens (F.M.Leight.) F.M.Leight. indigenous
- Agapanthus caulescens Spreng. indigenous
  - Agapanthus caulescens Spreng. subsp. angustifolius F.M.Leight. indigenous
  - Agapanthus caulescens Spreng. subsp. caulescens, indigenous
  - Agapanthus caulescens Spreng. subsp. gracilis (F.M.Leight.) F.M.Leight. endemic
- Agapanthus coddii F.M.Leight. endemic
- Agapanthus comptonii F.M.Leight. accepted as Agapanthus praecox Willd. subsp. minimus (Lindl.) F.M.Leight.
  - Agapanthus comptonii F.M.Leight. subsp. longitubus F.M.Leight. accepted as Agapanthus praecox Willd. subsp. minimus (Lindl.) F.M.Leight. indigenous
- Agapanthus dyeri F.M.Leight. accepted as Agapanthus inapertus P.Beauv. subsp. intermedius F.M.Leight. indigenous
- Agapanthus ensifolius (Thunb.) Willd. accepted as Lachenalia ensifolia (Thunb.) J.C.Manning & Goldblatt, indigenous
- Agapanthus inapertus P.Beauv. indigenous
  - Agapanthus inapertus P.Beauv. subsp. hollandii (F.M.Leight.) F.M.Leight. endemic
  - Agapanthus inapertus P.Beauv. subsp. inapertus endemic
  - Agapanthus inapertus P.Beauv. subsp. intermedius F.M.Leight. indigenous
  - Agapanthus inapertus P.Beauv. subsp. parviflorus F.M.Leight. endemic
  - Agapanthus inapertus P.Beauv. subsp. pendulus (L.Bolus) F.M.Leight. endemic
- Agapanthus nutans F.M.Leight. accepted as Agapanthus caulescens Spreng. subsp. gracilis (F.M.Leight.) F.M.Leight. indigenous
- Agapanthus praecox Willd. indigenous
  - Agapanthus praecox Willd. subsp. minimus (Lindl.) F.M.Leight. endemic
  - Agapanthus praecox Willd. subsp. orientalis (F.M.Leight.) F.M.Leight. endemic
  - Agapanthus praecox Willd. subsp. praecox, endemic
- Agapanthus walshii L.Bolus, indigenous

=== Mauhlia ===
Genus Mauhlia:

- Mauhlia ensifolia Thunb. accepted as Lachenalia ensifolia (Thunb.) J.C.Manning & Goldblatt, indigenous

== Agavaceae ==
Family: Agavaceae,

=== Agave ===
Genus Agave:

- Agave americana L. subsp. americana var. americana, not indigenous, invasive
- Agave americana L. subsp. americana var. expansa, not indigenous, invasive
- Agave angustifolia Haw. var. angustifolia, not indigenous
- Agave celsii Hook. var. albicans (Jacobi) Gentry, not indigenous
- Agave decipiens Baker, not indigenous
- Agave sisalana Perrine, not indigenous, invasive
- Agave vivipara L. var. vivipara, not indigenous
- Agave wercklei F.A.C.Weber ex A.Berger, not indigenous

=== Anthericum ===
Genus Anthericum:

- Anthericum acutum C.H.Wright, accepted as Chlorophytum acutum (C.H.Wright) Nordal, indigenous
- Anthericum angulicaule Baker, accepted as Chlorophytum angulicaule (Baker) Kativu, indigenous
- Anthericum calyptrocarpum Baker, accepted as Chlorophytum calyptrocarpum (Baker) Kativu, indigenous
- Anthericum cooperi Baker, accepted as Chlorophytum cooperi (Baker) Nordal, indigenous
- Anthericum cyperaceum Kies, accepted as Chlorophytum cyperaceum (Kies) Nordal, indigenous
- Anthericum fasciculatum Baker accepted as Chlorophytum fasciculatum (Baker) Kativu, indigenous
- Anthericum galpinii Baker, accepted as Chlorophytum galpinii (Baker) Kativu
- Anthericum galpinii Baker var. matabelense (Baker) Oberm. accepted as Chlorophytum galpinii (Baker) Kativu var. matabelense (Baker) Kativu, indigenous
- Anthericum galpinii Baker var. norlindhii (Weim.) Oberm. accepted as Chlorophytum galpinii (Baker) Kativu var. norlindhii (Weim.) Kativu, indigenous
- Anthericum haygarthii (J.M.Wood & M.S.Evans) Oberm. accepted as Chlorophytum haygarthii J.M.Wood & M.S.Evans, indigenous
- Anthericum krauseanum Dinter, accepted as Chlorophytum krauseanum (Dinter) Kativu, indigenous
- Anthericum longistylum Baker, accepted as Chlorophytum recurvifolium (Baker) C.Archer & Kativu, indigenous
- Anthericum radula Baker, accepted as Chlorophytum radula (Baker) Nordal, indigenous
- Anthericum rangei Engl. & K.Krause, accepted as Chlorophytum rangei (Engl. & K.Krause) Nordal, indigenous
- Anthericum saundersiae Baker, accepted as Chlorophytum saundersiae (Baker) Nordal, indigenous
- Anthericum transvaalense Baker, accepted as Chlorophytum transvaalense (Baker) Kativu, indigenous
- Anthericum trichophlebium Baker, accepted as Chlorophytum trichophlebium (Baker) Nordal, indigenous

=== Chlorophytum ===
Genus Chlorophytum:

- Chlorophytum acutum (C.H.Wright) Nordal, indigenous
- Chlorophytum angulicaule (Baker) Kativu, indigenous
- Chlorophytum aridum Oberm., indigenous
- Chlorophytum asperum J.C.Manning, endemic
- Chlorophytum bowkeri Baker, indigenous
- Chlorophytum calyptrocarpum (Baker) Kativu, indigenous
- Chlorophytum capense (L.) Voss, endemic
- Chlorophytum comosum (Thunb.) Jacques, indigenous
- Chlorophytum cooperi (Baker) Nordal, indigenous
- Chlorophytum crassinerve (Baker) Oberm. endemic
- Chlorophytum crispum (Thunb.) Baker, endemic
- Chlorophytum cyperaceum (Kies) Nordal, endemic
- Chlorophytum fasciculatum (Baker) Kativu, indigenous
- Chlorophytum galpinii (Baker) Kativu, indigenous
  - Chlorophytum galpinii (Baker) Kativu var. galpinii, indigenous
  - Chlorophytum galpinii (Baker) Kativu var. matabelense (Baker) Kativu, indigenous
  - Chlorophytum galpinii (Baker) Kativu var. norlindhii (Weim.) Kativu, indigenous
- Chlorophytum haygarthii J.M.Wood & M.S.Evans, indigenous
- Chlorophytum krauseanum (Dinter) Kativu, indigenous
- Chlorophytum krookianum Zahlbr. indigenous
- Chlorophytum lewisiae Oberm. endemic
- Chlorophytum macrosporum Baker, indigenous
- Chlorophytum modestum Baker, indigenous
- Chlorophytum monophyllum Oberm. endemic
- Chlorophytum namaquense Schltr. ex Poelln. endemic
- Chlorophytum pauciphyllum Oberm. endemic
- Chlorophytum polyphyllum (Baker) Kativu, accepted as Chlorophytum recurvifolium (Baker) C.Archer & Kativu
- Chlorophytum pulchellum Kunth accepted as Chlorophytum rigidum Kunth
- Chlorophytum radula (Baker) Nordal, endemic
- Chlorophytum rangei (Engl. & K.Krause) Nordal, indigenous
- Chlorophytum recurvifolium (Baker) C.Archer & Kativu, indigenous
- Chlorophytum rigidum Kunth, endemic
- Chlorophytum saundersiae (Baker) Nordal, endemic
- Chlorophytum transvaalense (Baker) Kativu, indigenous
- Chlorophytum trichophlebium (Baker) Nordal, endemic
- Chlorophytum triflorum (Aiton) Kunth, endemic
- Chlorophytum undulatum (Jacq.) Oberm. indigenous
- Chlorophytum viscosum Kunth, indigenous

=== Furcraea ===
Genus Furcraea:

- Furcraea foetida (L.) Haw. not indigenous, cultivated, invasive
- Furcraea selloana K.Koch, not indigenous
- Furcraea tuberosa (Mill.) W.T.Aiton, not indigenous

== Alliaceae ==
Family: Alliaceae,

=== Allium ===
Genus Allium:

- Allium dregeanum Kunth, accepted as Allium synnotii G.Don, endemic
- Allium synnotii G.Don, endemic
- Allium triquetrum L. not indigenous

=== Nothoscordum ===
Genus Nothoscordum:

- Nothoscordum borbonicum Kunth, not indigenous, invasive

=== Prototulbaghia ===
Genus Prototulbaghia:

- Prototulbaghia siebertii Vosa, accepted as Tulbaghia siebertii (Vosa) Mich.Moller & G.I.Stafford, endemic

=== Tulbaghia ===
Genus Tulbaghia:

- Tulbaghia acutiloba Harv. indigenous
- Tulbaghia alliacea L.f. endemic
- Tulbaghia capensis L. endemic
- Tulbaghia cepacea L.f. var. maritima Vosa, accepted as Tulbaghia maritima Vosa, endemic
- Tulbaghia cernua Ave-Lall. indigenous
- Tulbaghia coddii Vosa & R.B.Burb. endemic
- Tulbaghia cominsii Vosa, endemic
- Tulbaghia dregeana Kunth, endemic
- Tulbaghia galpinii Schltr. endemic
- Tulbaghia karasbergensis R.Glover, accepted as Tulbaghia tenuior K.Krause & Dinter
- Tulbaghia leucantha Baker, indigenous
- Tulbaghia ludwigiana Harv. indigenous
- Tulbaghia maritima Vosa, endemic
- Tulbaghia montana Vosa, indigenous
- Tulbaghia natalensis Baker, endemic
- Tulbaghia nutans Vosa, endemic
- Tulbaghia pretoriensis Vosa & Condy, endemic
- Tulbaghia siebertii (Vosa) Mich.Moller & G.I.Stafford, endemic
- Tulbaghia simmleri P.Beauv. endemic
- Tulbaghia tenuior K.Krause & Dinter, indigenous
- Tulbaghia transvaalensis Vosa, endemic
- Tulbaghia verdoorniae Vosa & R.B.Burb. endemic
- Tulbaghia violacea Harv. endemic
  - Tulbaghia violacea Harv. subsp. macmasteri Vosa, endemic
  - Tulbaghia violacea Harv. subsp. violacea, endemic
  - Tulbaghia violacea Harv. var. maritima Vosa, accepted as Tulbaghia maritima Vosa, endemic

== Amaryllidaceae ==
Family: Amaryllidaceae,

=== Amaryllis ===
Genus Amaryllis:

- Amaryllis belladonna L. endemic
- Amaryllis guttata L. accepted as Crossyne guttata (L.) D.Mull.-Doblies & U.Mull.-Doblies
- Amaryllis paradisicola Snijman, endemic

=== Ammocharis ===
Genus Ammocharis:

- Ammocharis coranica (Ker Gawl.) Herb. indigenous
- Ammocharis falcata Herb. accepted as Ammocharis longifolia (L.) M.Roem. indig
- Ammocharis herrei F.M.Leight. accepted as Ammocharis longifolia (L.) M.Roem.
- Ammocharis longifolia (L.) M.Roem. indigenous

=== Apodolirion ===
Genus Apodolirion:

- Apodolirion amyanum D.Mull.-Doblies, endemic
- Apodolirion bolusii Baker, endemic
- Apodolirion buchananii Baker, indigenous
- Apodolirion cedarbergense D.Mull.-Doblies, endemic
- Apodolirion lanceolatum (Thunb.) Baker, endemic
- Apodolirion macowanii Baker, endemic

=== Bokkeveldia ===
Genus Bokkeveldia:

- Bokkeveldia aestivalis (Snijman) D.Mull.-Doblies & U.Mull.-Doblies, accepted as Strumaria aestivalis Snijman
- Bokkeveldia perryae (Snijman) D.Mull.-Doblies & U.Mull.-Doblies, accepted as Strumaria perryae Snijman
- Bokkeveldia picta (W.F.Barker) D.Mull.-Doblies & U.Mull.-Doblies, accepted as Strumaria picta W.F.Barker
- Bokkeveldia pubescens (W.F.Barker) D.Mull.-Doblies & U.Mull.-Doblies, accepted as Strumaria pubescens W.F.Barker
- Bokkeveldia salteri (W.F.Barker) D.Mull.-Doblies & U.Mull.-Doblies, accepted as Strumaria salteri W.F.Barker
- Bokkeveldia watermeyeri (L.Bolus) D.Mull.-Doblies & U.Mull.-Doblies, accepted as Strumaria watermeyeri L.Bolus
- Bokkeveldia watermeyeri (L.Bolus) D.Mull.-Doblies & U.Mull.-Doblies subsp. botterkloofensis D.Mull.- accepted as Strumaria watermeyeri L.Bolus subsp. botterkloofensis (D.Mull.-Doblies & U.Mull.-Doblies) Snijman

=== Boophone ===
Genus Boophone:

- Boophone disticha (L.f.) Herb. indigenous
- Boophone flava W.F.Barker ex Snijman, accepted as Crossyne flava (W.F.Barker ex Snijman) D.Mull.-Doblies & U.Mull.-Doblies
- Boophone guttata (L.) Herb. accepted as Crossyne guttata (L.) D.Mull.-Doblies & U.Mull.-Doblies
- Boophone haemanthoides F.M.Leight. indigenous
- Boophone pulchra W.F.Barker, accepted as Brunsvigia pulchra (W.F.Barker) D.Mull.-Doblies & U.Mull.-Doblies

=== Brunsvigia ===
Genus Brunsvigia:

- Brunsvigia appendiculata F.M.Leight. accepted as Brunsvigia bosmaniae F.M.Leight.
- Brunsvigia bosmaniae F.M.Leight. indigenous
- Brunsvigia comptonii W.F.Barker, endemic
- Brunsvigia elandsmontana Snijman, endemic
- Brunsvigia gariepensis Snijman, indigenous
- Brunsvigia gigantea Heist. accepted as Brunsvigia orientalis (L.) Aiton ex Eckl. indigenous
- Brunsvigia grandiflora Lindl. endemic
- Brunsvigia gregaria R.A.Dyer, endemic
- Brunsvigia herrei F.M.Leight. ex W.F.Barker, indigenous
- Brunsvigia josephinae (Redoute) Ker Gawl. endemic
- Brunsvigia litoralis R.A.Dyer, endemic
- Brunsvigia marginata (Jacq.) Aiton, endemic
- Brunsvigia minor Lindl. accepted as Brunsvigia striata (Jacq.) Aiton
- Brunsvigia namaquana D.Mull.-Doblies & U.Mull.-Doblies, indigenous
- Brunsvigia natalensis Baker, indigenous
- Brunsvigia orientalis (L.) Aiton ex Eckl. endemic
- Brunsvigia pulchra (W.F.Barker) D.Mull.-Doblies & U.Mull.-Doblies, endemic
- Brunsvigia radula (Jacq.) W.T.Aiton, indigenous
- Brunsvigia radulosa Herb. indigenous
- Brunsvigia striata (Jacq.) Aiton, endemic
- Brunsvigia undulata F.M.Leight. endemic

=== Carpolyza ===
Genus Carpolyza:

- Carpolyza spiralis (L'Her.) Salisb. accepted as Strumaria spiralis L'Her.

=== Chlidanthus ===
Genus Chlidanthus:

- Chlidanthus fragrans Herb. not indigenous, cultivated

=== Clivia ===
Genus Clivia:

- Clivia caulescens R.A.Dyer, indigenous
- Clivia gardenii Hook. endemic
- Clivia miniata (Lindl.) Regel, indigenous
  - Clivia miniata (Lindl.) Regel var. citrina Watson, indigenous
  - Clivia miniata (Lindl.) Regel var. miniata, indigenous
- Clivia mirabilis Rourke, endemic
- Clivia nobilis Lindl. endemic
- Clivia robusta B.G.Murray, Ran, de Lange, Hammett, Truter & Swanev. endemic

=== Crinum ===
Genus Crinum:

- Crinum acaule Baker, endemic
- Crinum baumii Harms, accepted as Ammocharis baumii (Harms) Milne-Redh. & Schweick.
- Crinum bulbispermum (Burm.f.) Milne-Redh. & Schweick. indigenous
- Crinum buphanoides Welw. ex Baker, indigenous
- Crinum campanulatum Herb. endemic
- Crinum crassicaule Baker, indigenous
- Crinum delagoense I.Verd. accepted as Crinum stuhlmannii Baker
- Crinum foetidum I.Verd. accepted as Crinum crassicaule Baker
- Crinum graminicola I.Verd. indigenous
- Crinum lineare L.f. endemic
- Crinum lugardiae N.E.Br. indigenous
- Crinum macowanii Baker, indigenous
- Crinum minimum Milne-Redh. indigenous
- Crinum moorei Hook.f. indigenous
- Crinum paludosum I.Verd. indigenous
- Crinum stuhlmannii Baker, indigenous
- Crinum variabile (Jacq.) Herb. endemic

=== Crossyne ===
Genus Crossyne:

- Crossyne flava (W.F.Barker ex Snijman) D.Mull.-Doblies & U.Mull.-Doblies endemic
- Crossyne guttata (L.) D.Mull.-Doblies & U.Mull.-Doblies, endemic

=== Cyrtanthus ===
Genus Cyrtanthus:

- Cyrtanthus angustifolius (L.f.) Aiton, endemic
- Cyrtanthus attenuatus R.A.Dyer, indigenous
- Cyrtanthus aureolinus Snijman, indigenous
- Cyrtanthus bicolor R.A.Dyer, indigenous
- Cyrtanthus brachyscyphus Baker, endemic
- Cyrtanthus brachysiphon Hilliard & B.L.Burtt, endemic
- Cyrtanthus breviflorus Harv. indigenous
- Cyrtanthus carneus Lindl. endemic
- Cyrtanthus clavatus (L'Her.) R.A.Dyer, endemic
- Cyrtanthus collinus Ker Gawl. endemic
- Cyrtanthus contractus N.E.Br. indigenous
- Cyrtanthus debilis Snijman, endemic
- Cyrtanthus elatus (Jacq.) Traub, endemic
- Cyrtanthus epiphyticus J.M.Wood, indigenous
- Cyrtanthus erubescens Killick, endemic
- Cyrtanthus eucallus R.A.Dyer, endemic
- Cyrtanthus falcatus R.A.Dyer, endemic
- Cyrtanthus fergusoniae L.Bolus, endemic
- Cyrtanthus flammosus Snijman & Van Jaarsv. endemic
- Cyrtanthus flanaganii Baker, indigenous
- Cyrtanthus flavus P.E.Barnes, endemic
- Cyrtanthus galpinii Baker indigenous
- Cyrtanthus guthrieae L.Bolus, endemic
- Cyrtanthus helictus Lehm. endemic
- Cyrtanthus herrei (F.M.Leight.) R.A.Dyer, indigenous
- Cyrtanthus huttonii Baker, endemic
- Cyrtanthus inaequalis O'Brien, endemic
- Cyrtanthus junodii P.Beauv. endemic
- Cyrtanthus labiatus R.A.Dyer, endemic
- Cyrtanthus leptosiphon Snijman, endemic
- Cyrtanthus leucanthus Schltr. endemic
- Cyrtanthus loddigesianus (Herb.) R.A.Dyer, endemic
- Cyrtanthus lutescens Herb. accepted as Cyrtanthus ochroleucus (Herb.) Burch. ex Steud.
- Cyrtanthus mackenii Hook.f. indigenous
- Cyrtanthus mackenii Hook.f. subsp. mackenii, indigenous
- Cyrtanthus mackenii Hook.f. var. cooperi (Baker) R.A.Dyer, accepted as Cyrtanthus mackenii Hook.f. subsp. cooperi (Baker) Snijman, endemic
- Cyrtanthus macmasteri Snijman, endemic
- Cyrtanthus macowanii Baker, endemic
- Cyrtanthus montanus R.A.Dyer, endemic
- Cyrtanthus nutans R.A.Dyer, indigenous
- Cyrtanthus obliquus (L.f.) Aiton, endemic
- Cyrtanthus obrienii Baker, endemic
- Cyrtanthus ochroleucus (Herb.) Burch. ex Steud. endemic
- Cyrtanthus odorus Ker Gawl. endemic
- Cyrtanthus rhododactylus Stapf, endemic
- Cyrtanthus rotundilobus N.E.Br. endemic
- Cyrtanthus sanguineus (Lindl.) Walp. indigenous
  - Cyrtanthus sanguineus (Lindl.) Walp. subsp. sanguineus, indigenous
- Cyrtanthus smithiae Watt ex Harv. endemic
- Cyrtanthus speciosus R.A.Dyer, accepted as Cyrtanthus loddigesianus (Herb.) R.A.Dyer
- Cyrtanthus spiralis Burch. ex Ker Gawl. endemic
- Cyrtanthus staadensis Schonland, endemic
- Cyrtanthus stenanthus Baker, indigenous
  - Cyrtanthus stenanthus Baker var. major R.A.Dyer, indigenous
  - Cyrtanthus stenanthus Baker var. stenanthus, indigenous
- Cyrtanthus striatus Herb. indigenous
- Cyrtanthus suaveolens Schonland, endemic
- Cyrtanthus taitii G.D.Duncan, endemic
- Cyrtanthus thorncroftii C.H.Wright, endemic
- Cyrtanthus tuckii Baker, indigenous
  - Cyrtanthus tuckii Baker var. transvaalensis I.Verd. indigenous
  - Cyrtanthus tuckii Baker var. tuckii, endemic
  - Cyrtanthus tuckii Baker var. viridilobus I.Verd. endemic
- Cyrtanthus ventricosus Willd. endemic
- Cyrtanthus wellandii Snijman, endemic

=== Gemmaria ===
Genus Gemmaria:

- Gemmaria chaplinii (W.F.Barker) D.Mull.-Doblies & U.Mull.-Doblies, accepted as Strumaria chaplinii (W.F.Barker) Snijman
- Gemmaria discifera (Marloth ex Snijman) D.Mull.-Doblies & U.Mull.-Doblies, accepted as Strumaria discifera Marloth ex Snijman subsp. discifera
- Gemmaria gemmata (Ker Gawl.) Salisb. ex D.Mull.-Doblies & U.Mull.-Doblies, accepted as Strumaria gemmata Ker Gawl.
- Gemmaria karooica (W.F.Barker) D.Mull.-Doblies & U.Mull.-Doblies, accepted as Strumaria karooica (W.F.Barker) Snijman
- Gemmaria karooportensis D.Mull.-Doblies & U.Mull.-Doblies, accepted as Strumaria karoopoortensis (D.Mull.-Doblies & U.Mull.-Doblies) Snijman
- Gemmaria leipoldtii (L.Bolus) D.Mull.-Doblies & U.Mull.-Doblies, accepted as Strumaria leipoldtii (L.Bolus) Snijman
- Gemmaria massoniella D.Mull.-Doblies & U.Mull.-Doblies, accepted as Strumaria massoniella (D.Mull.-Doblies & U.Mull.-Doblies) Snijman
- Gemmaria mathewsii (W.F.Barker) D.Mull.-Doblies & U.Mull.-Doblies, accepted as Strumaria pygmaea Snijman
- Gemmaria merxmuelleriana D.Mull.-Doblies & U.Mull.-Doblies, accepted as Strumaria merxmuelleriana (D.Mull.-Doblies & U.Mull.-Doblies) Snijman
- Gemmaria pulcherrima D.Mull.-Doblies & U.Mull.-Doblies, accepted as Hessea pulcherrima (D.Mull.-Doblies & U.Mull.-Doblies) Snijman
- Gemmaria unguiculata (W.F.Barker) D.Mull.-Doblies & U.Mull.-Doblies, accepted as Strumaria unguiculata (W.F.Barker) Snijman

=== Gethyllis ===
Genus Gethyllis:

- Gethyllis afra L. endemic
- Gethyllis barkerae D.Mull.-Doblies, indigenous
  - Gethyllis barkerae D.Mull.-Doblies subsp. barkerae, endemic
  - Gethyllis barkerae D.Mull.-Doblies subsp. paucifolia D.Mull.-Doblies, endemic
- Gethyllis britteniana Baker indigenous
  - Gethyllis britteniana Baker subsp. britteniana, endemic
  - Gethyllis britteniana Baker subsp. bruynsii D.Mull.-Doblies, indigenous
  - Gethyllis britteniana Baker subsp. herrei (L.Bolus) D.Mull.-Doblies, endemic
- Gethyllis campanulata L.Bolus, endemic
- Gethyllis cavidens D.Mull.-Doblies, endemic
- Gethyllis ciliaris (Thunb.) Thunb. indigenous
  - Gethyllis ciliaris (Thunb.) Thunb. subsp. ciliaris, endemic
  - Gethyllis ciliaris (Thunb.) Thunb. subsp. longituba (L.Bolus) D.Mull.-Doblies, endemic
- Gethyllis fimbriatula D.Mull.-Doblies, endemic
- Gethyllis grandiflora L.Bolus, endemic
- Gethyllis gregoriana D.Mull.-Doblies, endemic
- Gethyllis hallii D.Mull.-Doblies, endemic
- Gethyllis heinzeana D.Mull.-Doblies, indigenous
- Gethyllis kaapensis D.Mull.-Doblies, endemic
- Gethyllis lanuginosa Marloth, endemic
- Gethyllis lata L.Bolus, indigenous
  - Gethyllis lata L.Bolus subsp. lata, endemic
  - Gethyllis lata L.Bolus subsp. orbicularis, D.Mull.-Doblies, endemic
- Gethyllis latifolia Masson ex Baker, endemic
- Gethyllis linearis L.Bolus, endemic
- Gethyllis longistyla Bolus, endemic
- Gethyllis marginata D.Mull.-Doblies, endemic
- Gethyllis namaquensis (Schonland) Oberm. indigenous
- Gethyllis oligophylla D.Mull.-Doblies, indigenous
- Gethyllis oliverorum D.Mull.-Doblies, endemic
- Gethyllis pectinata D.Mull.-Doblies, endemic
- Gethyllis polyanthera Sol. ex Britten, accepted as Gethyllis ciliaris (Thunb.) Thunb. subsp. ciliaris, indigenous
- Gethyllis roggeveldensis D.Mull.-Doblies, endemic
- Gethyllis setosa Marloth, endemic
- Gethyllis spiralis (Thunb.) Thunb. indigenous
- Gethyllis transkarooica D.Mull.-Doblies, indigenous
- Gethyllis undulata Herb. accepted as Gethyllis ciliaris (Thunb.) Thunb. subsp. ciliaris
- Gethyllis uteana D.Mull.-Doblies, endemic
- Gethyllis verrucosa Marloth, endemic
- Gethyllis verticillata R.Br. ex Herb. endemic
- Gethyllis villosa (Thunb.) Thunb. endemic

=== Haemanthus ===
Genus Haemanthus:

- Haemanthus albiflos Jacq. endemic
- Haemanthus amarylloides Jacq. indigenous
  - Haemanthus amarylloides Jacq. subsp. amarylloides, endemic
  - Haemanthus amarylloides Jacq. subsp. polyanthus Snijman, endemic
  - Haemanthus amarylloides Jacq. subsp. toximontanus Snijman, endemic
- Haemanthus barkerae Snijman, endemic
- Haemanthus canaliculatus Levyns, endemic
- Haemanthus carneus Ker Gawl. endemic
- Haemanthus coccineus L. indigenous
- Haemanthus crispus Snijman, endemic
- Haemanthus dasyphyllus Snijman, endemic
- Haemanthus deformis Hook.f. endemic
- Haemanthus graniticus Snijman, endemic
- Haemanthus humilis Jacq. indigenous
  - Haemanthus humilis Jacq. subsp. hirsutus (Baker) Snijman, indigenous
  - Haemanthus humilis Jacq. subsp. humilis, indigenous
- Haemanthus lanceifolius Jacq. indigenous
- Haemanthus montanus Baker, indigenous
- Haemanthus namaquensis R.A.Dyer, indigenous
- Haemanthus nortieri Isaac, endemic
- Haemanthus pauculifolius Snijman & A.E.van Wyk, indigenous
- Haemanthus pubescens L.f. indigenous
  - Haemanthus pubescens L.f. subsp. arenicola Snijman indigenous
  - Haemanthus pubescens L.f. subsp. leipoldtii Snijman, endemic
  - Haemanthus pubescens L.f. subsp. pubescens, endemic
- Haemanthus pumilio Jacq. endemic
- Haemanthus sanguineus Jacq. endemic
- Haemanthus sessiliflorus Dinter, accepted as Massonia sessiliflora (Dinter) Mart.-Azorin, M.B.Crespo, M.Pinter & Wetschnig, indigenous
- Haemanthus tristis Snijman, endemic
- Haemanthus unifoliatus Snijman, endemic

=== Hessea ===
Genus Hessea:

- Hessea brachyscypha Baker, accepted as Hessea breviflora Herb.
- Hessea breviflora Herb. endemic
- Hessea cinnabarina D.Mull.-Doblies & U.Mull.-Doblies, accepted as Hessea stellaris (Jacq.) Herb.
- Hessea cinnamomea (L'Her.) T.Durand & Schinz, endemic
- Hessea incana Snijman, endemic
- Hessea longituba D.Mull.-Doblies & U.Mull.-Doblies, accepted as Hessea breviflora Herb.
- Hessea mathewsii W.F.Barker, endemic
- Hessea monticola Snijman, endemic
- Hessea pilosula D.Mull.-Doblies & U.Mull.-Doblies, endemic
- Hessea pulcherrima (D.Mull.-Doblies & U.Mull.-Doblies) Snijman, endemic
- Hessea pusilla Snijman, endemic
- Hessea speciosa Snijman, indigenous
- Hessea stellaris (Jacq.) Herb. endemic
- Hessea stenosiphon (Snijman) D.Mull.-Doblies & U.Mull.-Doblies, endemic
- Hessea tenuipedicellata Snijman, endemic
- Hessea undosa Snijman, endemic
- Hessea weberlingiorum D.Mull.-Doblies & U.Mull.-Doblies, accepted as Hessea stellaris (Jacq.) Herb.
- Hessea zeyheri Baker, accepted as Hessea breviflora Herb.

=== Leucojum ===
Genus Leucojum:

- Leucojum aestivum L. not indigenous, cultivated

=== Namaquanula ===
Genus Namaquanula:

- Namaquanula bruce-bayeri D.Mull.-Doblies & U.Mull.-Doblies, indigenous

=== Narcissus ===
Genus Narcissus:

- Narcissus tazetta L. subsp. tazetta, not indigenous, cultivated

=== Nerine ===
Genus Nerine:

- Nerine angustifolia (Baker) Baker, indigenous
- Nerine appendiculata Baker, endemic
- Nerine bowdenii W.Watson, endemic
  - Nerine bowdenii W.Watson 'Quinton Wells' E.B.Anderson, accepted as Nerine bowdenii W.Watson subsp. wellsii C.A.Norris ex G.D.Duncan indigenous
  - Nerine bowdenii W.Watson subsp. wellsii C.A.Norris ex G.D.Duncan, endemic
  - Nerine bowdenii Watson subsp. bowdenii, endemic
  - Nerine bowdenii Watson subsp. wellsii C.A.Norris, accepted as Nerine bowdenii W.Watson subsp. wellsii C.A.Norris ex G.D.Duncan, indigenous
- Nerine filamentosa W.F.Barker, endemic
- Nerine filifolia Baker, endemic
- Nerine frithii L.Bolus, endemic
- Nerine gaberonensis Bremek. & Oberm. indigenous
- Nerine gibsonii Douglas, endemic
- Nerine gracilis R.A.Dyer, endemic
- Nerine hesseoides L.Bolus, endemic
- Nerine humilis (Jacq.) Herb. endemic
- Nerine huttoniae Schonland, endemic
- Nerine krigei W.F.Barker, endemic
- Nerine laticoma (Ker Gawl.) T.Durand & Schinz, indigenous
- Nerine marincowitzii Snijman, endemic
- Nerine masoniorum L.Bolus, endemic
- Nerine pancratioides Baker, endemic
- Nerine platypetala McNeil, endemic
- Nerine pudica Hook.f. endemic
- Nerine rehmannii (Baker) L.Bolus, indigenous
- Nerine ridleyi E.Phillips, endemic
- Nerine sarniensis (L.) Herb. endemic
- Nerine transvaalensis L.Bolus, indigenous
- Nerine undulata (L.) Herb. endemic

=== Pancratium ===
Genus Pancratium:

- Pancratium tenuifolium Hochst. ex A.Rich. indigenous

=== Scadoxus ===
Genus Scadoxus:

- Scadoxus membranaceus (Baker) Friis & Nordal, endemic
- Scadoxus multiflorus (Martyn) Raf. indigenous
  - Scadoxus multiflorus (Martyn) Raf. subsp. katharinae (Baker) Friis & Nordal, indigenous
  - Scadoxus multiflorus (Martyn) Raf. subsp. multiflorus, indigenous
- Scadoxus puniceus (L.) Friis & Nordal, indigenous

=== Strumaria ===
Genus Strumaria:

- Strumaria aestivalis Snijman, endemic
- Strumaria angustifolia Jacq. Strumaria truncata Jacq.
- Strumaria barbarae Oberm. indigenous
- Strumaria bidentata Schinz, indigenous
- Strumaria chaplinii (W.F.Barker) Snijman, endemic
- Strumaria discifera Marloth ex Snijman, indigenous
  - Strumaria discifera Marloth ex Snijman subsp. bulbifera Snijman, endemic
  - Strumaria discifera Marloth ex Snijman subsp. discifera, indigenous
- Strumaria gemmata Ker Gawl. endemic
- Strumaria karooica (W.F.Barker) Snijman, endemic
- Strumaria karoopoortensis (D.Mull.-Doblies & U.Mull.-Doblies) Snijman, endemic
- Strumaria leipoldtii (L.Bolus) Snijman, endemic
- Strumaria linguaefolia Jacq. accepted as Strumaria truncata Jacq.
- Strumaria luteoloba Snijman, indigenous
- Strumaria massoniella (D.Mull.-Doblies & U.Mull.-Doblies) Snijman, endemic
- Strumaria merxmuelleriana (D.Mull.-Doblies & U.Mull.-Doblies) Snijman, endemic
- Strumaria perryae Snijman, endemic
- Strumaria picta W.F.Barker, endemic
- Strumaria prolifera Snijman, endemic
- Strumaria pubescens W.F.Barker, endemic
- Strumaria pygmaea Snijman, endemic
- Strumaria rubella Jacq. accepted as Strumaria truncata Jacq.
- Strumaria salteri W.F.Barker, endemic
- Strumaria spiralis L'Her. endemic
- Strumaria tenella (L.f.) Snijman, indigenous
  - Strumaria tenella (L.f.) Snijman, subsp. orientalis Snijman indig
  - Strumaria tenella (L.f.) Snijman subsp. tenella, endemic
- Strumaria truncata Jacq. endemic
- Strumaria unguiculata (W.F.Barker) Snijman, endemic
- Strumaria villosa Snijman, endemic
- Strumaria watermeyeri L.Bolus, indigenous
  - Strumaria watermeyeri L.Bolus subsp. botterkloofensis (D.Mull.-Doblies & U.Mull.-Doblies) Snijman, endemic
  - Strumaria watermeyeri L.Bolus subsp. watermeyeri, endemic

=== Tedingea ===
Genus Tedingea:

- Tedingea pygmaea (Snijman) D.Mull.-Doblies & U.Mull.-Doblies accepted as Strumaria pygmaea Snijman
- Tedingea tenella (L.f.) D.Mull.-Doblies & U.Mull.-Doblies, accepted as Strumaria tenella (L.f.) Snijman subsp. tenella

=== Zephyranthes ===
Genus Zephyranthes:

- Zephyranthes minuta (Kunth) D.Dietr., syn. Z. grandiflora, not indigenous, cultivated
- Zephyranthes robusta (Herb.) Baker, syn. Habranthus robustus, not indigenous, cultivated

== Asparagaceae ==
Family: Asparagaceae,

=== Asparagus ===
Genus Asparagus:

- Asparagus acocksii Jessop, indigenous
- Asparagus aethiopicus L. indigenous
- Asparagus africanus Lam. indigenous
- Asparagus aggregatus (Oberm.) Fellingham & N.L.Mey. endemic
- Asparagus alopecurus (Oberm.) Malcomber & Sebsebe, endemic
- Asparagus angusticladus (Jessop) J.-P.Lebrun & Stork, indigenous
- Asparagus asparagoides (L.) Druce, indigenous
- Asparagus aspergillus Jessop, indigenous
- Asparagus bayeri (Oberm.) Fellingham & N.L.Mey. endemic
- Asparagus bechuanicus Baker, indigenous
- Asparagus biflorus (Oberm.) Fellingham & N.L.Mey. indigenous
- Asparagus buchananii Baker, indigenous
- Asparagus burchellii Baker, endemic
- Asparagus capensis L. indigenous
  - Asparagus capensis L. var. capensis, indigenous
  - Asparagus capensis L. var. litoralis Suess. & Karl, indigenous
- Asparagus clareae (Oberm.) Fellingham & N.L.Mey. endemic
- Asparagus coddii (Oberm.) Fellingham & N.L.Mey., indigenous
- Asparagus concinnus (Baker) Kies, indigenous
- Asparagus confertus K.Krause, endemic
- Asparagus cooperi Baker, indigenous
- Asparagus crassicladus Jessop, endemic
- Asparagus declinatus L. indigenous
- Asparagus densiflorus (Kunth) Jessop, indigenous
- Asparagus denudatus (Kunth) Baker, indigenous
- Asparagus devenishii (Oberm.) Fellingham & N.L.Mey. endemic
- Asparagus divaricatus (Oberm.) Fellingham & N.L.Mey. indigenous
- Asparagus edulis (Oberm.) J.-P.Lebrun & Stork, indigenous
- Asparagus elephantinus S.M.Burrows, endemic
- Asparagus exsertus (Oberm.) Fellingham & N.L.Mey. endemic
- Asparagus exuvialis Burch. indigenous
  - Asparagus exuvialis Burch. forma ecklonii (Baker) Fellingham & N.L.Mey. indigenous
  - Asparagus exuvialis Burch. forma exuvialis, indigenous
- Asparagus falcatus L. indigenous
- Asparagus fasciculatus Thunb. indigenous
- Asparagus filicladus (Oberm.) Fellingham & N.L.Mey. endemic
- Asparagus flavicaulis (Oberm.) Fellingham & N.L.Mey. indigenous
  - Asparagus flavicaulis (Oberm.) Fellingham & N.L.Mey. subsp. flavicaulis, indigenous
  - Asparagus flavicaulis (Oberm.) Fellingham & N.L.Mey. subsp. setulosus (Oberm.) Fellingham & N.L.Mey. endemic
- Asparagus fourei (Oberm.) Fellingham & N.L.Mey. endemic
- Asparagus fractiflexus (Oberm.) Fellingham & N.L.Mey. endemic
- Asparagus glaucus Kies, indigenous
- Asparagus graniticus (Oberm.) Fellingham & N.L.Mey. indigenous
- Asparagus hirsutus S.M.Burrows, indigenous
- Asparagus intricatus (Oberm.) Fellingham & N.L.Mey. endemic
- Asparagus juniperoides Engl. indigenous
- Asparagus kraussianus (Kunth) J.F.Macbr. endemic
- Asparagus krebsianus (Kunth) Jessop, endemic
- Asparagus laricinus Burch. indigenous
- Asparagus lignosus Burm.f. endemic
- Asparagus lynetteae (Oberm.) Fellingham & N.L.Mey. indigenous
- Asparagus macowanii Baker, endemic
- Asparagus mariae (Oberm.) Fellingham & N.L.Mey. endemic
- Asparagus microraphis (Kunth) Baker, indigenous
- Asparagus minutiflorus (Kunth) Baker, indigenous
- Asparagus mollis (Oberm.) Fellingham & N.L.Mey. endemic
- Asparagus mucronatus Jessop, endemic
- Asparagus multiflorus Baker, endemic
- Asparagus multituberosus R.A.Dyer, endemic
- Asparagus natalensis (Baker) J.-P.Lebrun & Stork, indigenous
- Asparagus nelsii Schinz, indigenous
- Asparagus nodulosus (Oberm.) J.-P.Lebrun & Stork, indigenous
- Asparagus oliveri (Oberm.) Fellingham & N.L.Mey. endemic
- Asparagus ovatus T.M.Salter, endemic
- Asparagus oxyacanthus Baker, endemic
- Asparagus pearsonii Kies, indigenous
- Asparagus plumosus Baker, indigenous
- Asparagus racemosus Willd, indigenous
- Asparagus ramosissimus Baker, indigenous
- Asparagus recurvispinus (Oberm.) Fellingham & N.L.Mey. endemic
- Asparagus retrofractus L. indigenous
- Asparagus rigidus Jessop, endemic
- Asparagus rubicundus P.J.Bergius, endemic
- Asparagus saundersiae Baker, indigenous
- Asparagus scandens Thunb. endemic
- Asparagus schroederi Engl. indigenous
- Asparagus sekukuniensis (Oberm.) Fellingham & N.L.Mey. endemic
- Asparagus setaceus (Kunth) Jessop, indigenous
- Asparagus spinescens Steud. ex Roem. & Schult. endemic
- Asparagus stellatus Baker, indigenous
- Asparagus stipulaceus Lam. endemic
- Asparagus striatus (L.f.) Thunb. endemic
- Asparagus suaveolens Burch. indigenous
- Asparagus subulatus Thunb. endemic
- Asparagus sylvicola S.M.Burrows, endemic
- Asparagus transvaalensis (Oberm.) Fellingham & N.L.Mey. indigenous
- Asparagus undulatus (L.f.) Thunb. indigenous
- Asparagus virgatus Baker, indigenous
- Asparagus volubilis Thunb. endemic

=== Behnia ===
Genus Behnia:

- Behnia reticulata (Thunb.) Didr. indigenous

=== Myrsiphyllum ===
Genus Myrsiphyllum:

- Myrsiphyllum alopecurum Oberm. accepted as Asparagus alopecurus (Oberm.) Malcomber & Sebsebe
- Myrsiphyllum asparagoides (L.) Willd. accepted as Asparagus asparagoides (L.) Druce
- Myrsiphyllum declinatum (L.) Oberm. accepted as Asparagus declinatus L.
- Myrsiphyllum fasciculatum (Thunb.) Oberm. accepted as Asparagus fasciculatus Thunb.
- Myrsiphyllum juniperoides (Engl.) Oberm. accepted as Asparagus juniperoides Engl.
- Myrsiphyllum kraussianum Kunth accepted as Asparagus kraussianus (Kunth) J.F.Macbr.
- Myrsiphyllum multituberosum (R.A.Dyer) Oberm. accepted as Asparagus multituberosus R.A.Dyer
- Myrsiphyllum ovatum (T.M.Salter) Oberm. accepted as Asparagus ovatus T.M.Salter
- Myrsiphyllum ramosissimum (Baker) Oberm. accepted as Asparagus ramosissimus Baker
- Myrsiphyllum scandens (Thunb.) Oberm. accepted as Asparagus scandens Thunb.
- Myrsiphyllum undulatum (L.f.) Oberm. accepted as Asparagus undulatus (L.f.) Thunb.
- Myrsiphyllum volubile (Thunb.) Oberm. accepted as Asparagus volubilis Thunb.

=== Protasparagus ===
Genus Protasparagus:

- Protasparagus acocksii (Jessop) Oberm. accepted as Asparagus acocksii Jessop
- Protasparagus aethiopicus (L.) Oberm. accepted as Asparagus aethiopicus L.
- Protasparagus africanus (Lam.) Oberm. accepted as Asparagus africanus Lam.
- Protasparagus aggregatus Oberm. accepted as Asparagus aggregatus (Oberm.) Fellingham & N.L.Mey.
- Protasparagus angusticladus (Jessop) Oberm. accepted as Asparagus angusticladus (Jessop) J.-P.Lebrun & Stork
- Protasparagus aspergillus (Jessop) Oberm. accepted as Asparagus aspergillus Jessop
- Protasparagus bayeri Oberm. accepted as Asparagus bayeri (Oberm.) Fellingham & N.L.Mey.
- Protasparagus bechuanicus (Baker) Oberm. accepted as Asparagus bechuanicus Baker
- Protasparagus biflorus Oberm. accepted as Asparagus biflorus (Oberm.) Fellingham & N.L.Mey.
- Protasparagus buchananii (Baker) Oberm. accepted as Asparagus buchananii Baker
- Protasparagus burchellii (Baker) Oberm. accepted as Asparagus burchellii Baker
- Protasparagus capensis (L.) Oberm. var. capensis accepted as Asparagus capensis L. var. capensis
- Protasparagus capensis (L.) Oberm. var. litoralis Suess. & Karl accepted as Asparagus capensis L. var. litoralis Suess. & Karl
- Protasparagus clareae Oberm. accepted as Asparagus clareae (Oberm.) Fellingham & N.L.Mey.
- Protasparagus coddii Oberm. accepted as Asparagus coddii (Oberm.) Fellingham & N.L.Mey.
- Protasparagus concinnus (Baker) Oberm. & Immelman accepted as Asparagus concinnus (Baker) Kies
- Protasparagus confertus (K.Krause) Oberm. accepted as Asparagus confertus K.Krause
- Protasparagus cooperi (Baker) Oberm. accepted as Asparagus cooperi Baker
- Protasparagus crassicladus (Jessop) Oberm. accepted as Asparagus crassicladus Jessop
- Protasparagus densiflorus (Kunth) Oberm. accepted as Asparagus densiflorus (Kunth) Jessop
- Protasparagus denudatus (Kunth) Oberm. accepted as Asparagus denudatus (Kunth) Baker
- Protasparagus devenishii Oberm. accepted as Asparagus devenishii (Oberm.) Fellingham & N.L.Mey.
- Protasparagus divaricatus Oberm. accepted as Asparagus divaricatus (Oberm.) Fellingham & N.L.Mey.
- Protasparagus edulis Oberm. accepted as Asparagus edulis (Oberm.) J.-P.Lebrun & Stork
- Protasparagus exsertus Oberm. accepted as Asparagus exsertus (Oberm.) Fellingham & N.L.Mey.
- Protasparagus exuvialis (Burch.) Oberm. forma ecklonii (Baker) Oberm. accepted as Asparagus exuvialis Burch. forma ecklonii (Baker) Fellingham & N.L.Mey.
- Protasparagus exuvialis (Burch.) Oberm. forma exuvialis accepted as Asparagus exuvialis Burch. forma exuvialis
- Protasparagus falcatus (L.) Oberm. accepted as Asparagus falcatus L.
- Protasparagus filicladus Oberm. accepted as Asparagus filicladus (Oberm.) Fellingham & N.L.Mey.
- Protasparagus flavicaulis Oberm. subsp. flavicaulis accepted as Asparagus flavicaulis (Oberm.) Fellingham & N.L.Mey. subsp. flavicaulis
- Protasparagus flavicaulis Oberm. subsp. setulosus Oberm. accepted as Asparagus flavicaulis (Oberm.) Fellingham & N.L.Mey. subsp. setulosus (Oberm.) Fellingham & N.L.Mey.
- Protasparagus fouriei Oberm. accepted as Asparagus fourei (Oberm.) Fellingham & N.L.Mey.
- Protasparagus fractiflexus Oberm. accepted as Asparagus fractiflexus (Oberm.) Fellingham & N.L.Mey.
- Protasparagus glaucus (Kies) Oberm. accepted as Asparagus glaucus Kies
- Protasparagus graniticus Oberm. accepted as Asparagus graniticus (Oberm.) Fellingham & N.L.Mey.
- Protasparagus intricatus Oberm. accepted as Asparagus intricatus (Oberm.) Fellingham & N.L.Mey.
- Protasparagus krebsianus (Kunth) Oberm. accepted as Asparagus krebsianus (Kunth) Jessop
- Protasparagus laricinus (Burch.) Oberm. accepted as Asparagus laricinus Burch.
- Protasparagus lignosus (Burm.f.) Oberm. accepted as Asparagus lignosus Burm.f.
- Protasparagus longicladus (N.E.Br.) B.Mathew, accepted as Asparagus longicladus N.E.Br.
- Protasparagus lynettae Oberm. accepted as Asparagus lynetteae (Oberm.) Fellingham & N.L.Mey.
- Protasparagus macowanii (Baker) Oberm. accepted as Asparagus macowanii Baker
- Protasparagus mariae Oberm. accepted as Asparagus mariae (Oberm.) Fellingham & N.L.Mey.
- Protasparagus microraphis (Kunth) Oberm. accepted as Asparagus microraphis (Kunth) Baker
- Protasparagus minutiflorus (Kunth) Oberm. accepted as Asparagus minutiflorus (Kunth) Baker
- Protasparagus mollis Oberm. accepted as Asparagus mollis (Oberm.) Fellingham & N.L.Mey.
- Protasparagus mucronatus (Jessop) Oberm. accepted as Asparagus mucronatus Jessop
- Protasparagus multiflorus (Baker) Oberm. accepted as Asparagus multiflorus Baker
- Protasparagus natalensis (Baker) Oberm. accepted as Asparagus natalensis (Baker) J.-P.Lebrun & Stork
- Protasparagus nelsii (Schinz) Oberm. accepted as Asparagus nelsii Schinz
- Protasparagus nodulosus Oberm. accepted as Asparagus nodulosus (Oberm.) J.-P.Lebrun & Stork
- Protasparagus oliveri Oberm. accepted as Asparagus oliveri (Oberm.) Fellingham & N.L.Mey.
- Protasparagus oxyacanthus (Baker) Oberm. accepted as Asparagus oxyacanthus Baker
- Protasparagus pearsonii (Kies) Oberm. accepted as Asparagus pearsonii Kies
- Protasparagus pendulus Oberm. accepted as Asparagus pendulus (Oberm.) J.-P.Lebrun & Stork
- Protasparagus plumosus (Baker) Oberm. accepted as Asparagus plumosus Baker
- Protasparagus racemosus (Willd.) Oberm. accepted as Asparagus racemosus Willd.
- Protasparagus recurvispinus Oberm. accepted as Asparagus recurvispinus (Oberm.) Fellingham & N.L.Mey.
- Protasparagus retrofractus (L.) Oberm. accepted as Asparagus retrofractus L.
- Protasparagus rigidus (Jessop) Oberm. accepted as Asparagus rigidus Jessop
- Protasparagus rubicundus (P.J.Bergius) Oberm. accepted as Asparagus rubicundus P.J.Bergius
- Protasparagus schroederi (Engl.) Oberm. accepted as Asparagus schroederi Engl.
- Protasparagus sekukuniensis Oberm. accepted as Asparagus sekukuniensis (Oberm.) Fellingham & N.L.Mey.
- Protasparagus setaceus (Kunth) Oberm. accepted as Asparagus setaceus (Kunth) Jessop
- Protasparagus spinescens (Steud. ex Roem. & Schult.) Oberm. accepted as Asparagus spinescens Steud. ex Roem. & Schult.
- Protasparagus stellatus (Baker) Oberm. accepted as Asparagus stellatus Baker
- Protasparagus stipulaceus (Lam.) Oberm. accepted as Asparagus stipulaceus Lam.
- Protasparagus striatus (L.f.) Oberm. accepted as Asparagus striatus (L.f.) Thunb.
- Protasparagus suaveolens (Burch.) Oberm. accepted as Asparagus suaveolens Burch.
- Protasparagus subulatus (Thunb.) Oberm. accepted as Asparagus subulatus Thunb.
- Protasparagus transvaalensis Oberm. accepted as Asparagus transvaalensis (Oberm.) Fellingham & N.L.Mey.
- Protasparagus virgatus (Baker) Oberm. accepted as Asparagus virgatus Baker

== Asphodelaceae ==
Family: Asphodelaceae, 21 genera have been recorded. Not all are necessarily currently accepted.

- Genus Aloe:
- Genus Aloiampelos:
- Genus Aloiampelos:
- Genus Aloidendron:
- Genus Apicra:
- Genus Aristaloe:
- Genus Asphodelus:
- Genus Astroloba:
- Genus Bulbine:
- Genus Bulbinella:
- Genus Catevala:
- Genus Chortolirion:
- Genus Gasteria:
- Genus Gonialoe:
- Genus Haworthia:
- Genus Kniphofia:
- Genus Kumara:
- Genus Leptaloe:
- Genus Poellnitzia:
- Genus Trachyandra:
- Genus Tulista:

== Hemerocallidaceae ==
Family: Hemerocallidaceae,

=== Caesia ===
Genus Caesia:

- Caesia capensis (Bolus) Oberm. endemic
- Caesia contorta (L.f.) T.Durand & Schinz, endemic
- Caesia sabulosa Boatwr. & J.C.Manning, indigenous

=== Cianella ===
Genus Dianella:

- Dianella caerulea Sims, not indigenous, cultivated

=== Phormium ===
Genus Phormium:

- Phormium aloides L.f. accepted as Lachenalia aloides (L.f.) Engl. indigenous
- Phormium bulbiferum Cirillo, accepted as Lachenalia bulbifera (Cirillo) Engl. indigenous
- Phormium hirtum Thunb. accepted as Lachenalia hirta (Thunb.) Thunb. indigenous

== Hyacinthaceae ==
Family: Hyacinthaceae, 43 genera have been recorded. Not all are necessarily currently accepted.

- Genus Albuca:
- Genus Amphisiphon:
- Genus Baeoterpe:
- Genus Bowiea:
- Genus Brachyscypha:
- Genus Coelanthus:
- Genus Daubenya:
- Genus Desertia:
- Genus Dipcadi:
- Genus Drimia:
- Genus Drimiopsis:
- Genus Eliokarmos:
- Genus Elsiea:
- Genus Ethesia:
- Genus Eucomis:
- Genus Galtonia:
- Genus Hyacinthus:
- Genus Lachenalia:
- Genus Ledebouria:
- Genus Lindneria:
- Genus Litanthus:
- Genus Massonia:
- Genus Merwilla:
- Genus Nicipe:
- Genus Ornithogalum:
- Genus Periboea:
- Genus Polyanthes:
- Genus Polyxena:
- Genus Pseudogaltonia:
- Genus Pseudoprospero:
- Genus Resnova:
- Genus Rhadamanthus:
- Genus Schizobasis:
- Genus Schizocarphus:
- Genus Scilla:
- Genus Spetaea:
- Genus Stellarioides:
- Genus Tenicroa:
- Genus Thuranthos:
- Genus Trimelopter:
- Genus Urginea:
- Genus Veltheimia
- Genus Whiteheadia:

== Hypoxidaceae ==
Family: Hypoxidaceae:

=== Empodium ===
Genus Empodium:

- Empodium elongatum (Nel) B.L.Burtt, indigenous
- Empodium flexile (Nel) M.F.Thomps. ex Snijman, endemic
- Empodium gloriosum (Nel) B.L.Burtt, endemic
- Empodium monophyllum (Nel) B.L.Burtt, indigenous
- Empodium namaquensis (Baker) M.F.Thomps. endemic
- Empodium occidentale (Nel) B.L.Burtt, accepted as Pauridia alticola Snijman & Kocyan
- Empodium plicatum (Thunb.) Garside, endemic
- Empodium veratrifolium (Willd.) M.F.Thomps. endemic

=== Hypoxis ===
Genus Hypoxis:

- Hypoxis acuminata Baker, indigenous
- Hypoxis angustifolia Lam. indigenous
  - Hypoxis angustifolia Lam. var. angustifolia, indigenous
  - Hypoxis angustifolia Lam. var. buchananii Baker, indigenous
- Hypoxis argentea Harv. ex Baker, indigenous
  - Hypoxis argentea Harv. ex Baker var. argentea, indigenous
  - Hypoxis argentea Harv. ex Baker var. sericea Baker, indigenous
- Hypoxis barbacenioides Harv. ex Baker, accepted as Xerophyta elegans (Balf.) Baker
- Hypoxis colchicifolia Baker, endemic
- Hypoxis cordata Nel, accepted as Hypoxis rigidula Baker var. rigidula
- Hypoxis costata Baker, indigenous
- Hypoxis decumbens L. not indigenous
- Hypoxis distachya Nel, accepted as Hypoxis colchicifolia Baker
- Hypoxis ecklonii Baker, accepted as Hypoxis floccosa Baker
- Hypoxis elliptica Nel, accepted as Hypoxis rigidula Baker var. rigidula
- Hypoxis exaltata Nel, endemic
- Hypoxis filiformis Baker, indigenous
- Hypoxis flanaganii Baker, endemic
- Hypoxis floccosa Baker, endemic
- Hypoxis galpinii Baker, indigenous
- Hypoxis gerrardii Baker, indigenous
- Hypoxis gilgiana Nel, accepted as Hypoxis colchicifolia Baker
- Hypoxis hemerocallidea Fisch. C.A.Mey. & Ave-Lall. indigenous
- Hypoxis interjecta Nel, endemic
- Hypoxis iridifolia Baker, indigenous
- Hypoxis kraussiana Buchinger, indigenous
- Hypoxis lata Nel, indigenous
- Hypoxis limicola B.L.Burtt, indigenous
- Hypoxis longifolia Baker, endemic
- Hypoxis ludwigii Baker, indigenous
- Hypoxis membranacea Baker, indigenous
- Hypoxis multiceps Buchinger ex Baker, indigenous
- Hypoxis neliana Schinz, indigenous
- Hypoxis nivea Y.Singh, indigenous
- Hypoxis obconica Nel, endemic
- Hypoxis obliqua Jacq. accepted as Hypoxis villosa L.f. var. obliqua (Jacq.) Baker
- Hypoxis oblonga Nel, endemic
- Hypoxis obtusa Burch. accepted as Hypoxis iridifolia Baker
- Hypoxis obtusa Burch. ex Ker Gawl. indigenous
- Hypoxis parvifolia Baker, indigenous
- Hypoxis parvula Baker, indigenous
  - Hypoxis parvula Baker var. albiflora B.L.Burtt, endemic
  - Hypoxis parvula Baker var. parvula, indigenous
- Hypoxis patula Nel, endemic
- Hypoxis rigidula Baker, indigenous
  - Hypoxis rigidula Baker var. pilosissima Baker, indigenous
  - Hypoxis rigidula Baker var. rigidula, indigenous
- Hypoxis sagittata Nel, endemic
- Hypoxis setosa Baker, endemic
- Hypoxis sobolifera Jacq. indigenous
  - Hypoxis sobolifera Jacq. var. sobolifera (Jacq.) Nel, endemic
- Hypoxis stellipilis Ker Gawl. endemic
- Hypoxis tetramera Hilliard & B.L.Burtt, indigenous
- Hypoxis uniflorata Markotter, endemic
- Hypoxis vellosioides Harv. ex Baker, accepted as Xerophyta retinervis Baker var. retinervis
- Hypoxis villosa L.f. indigenous
  - Hypoxis villosa L.f. var. obliqua (Jacq.) Baker, indigenous
  - Hypoxis villosa L.f. var. pannosa Baker, indigenous
  - Hypoxis villosa L.f. var. villosa, indigenous
- Hypoxis woodii Baker, indigenous
- Hypoxis zeyheri Baker, endemic

=== Pauridia ===
Genus Pauridia:

- Pauridia acida (Nel) Snijman & Kocyan, indigenous
- Pauridia aemulans (Nel) Snijman & Kocyan, indigenous
- Pauridia affinis (Schult. & Schult.f.) Snijman & Kocyan, indigenous
- Pauridia alba (Thunb.) Snijman & Kocyan, indigenous
- Pauridia alticola Snijman & Kocyan, indigenous
- Pauridia aquatica (L.f.) Snijman & Kocyan, indigenous
- Pauridia breviscapa Snijman, indigenous
- Pauridia canaliculata (Garside) Snijman & Kocyan, indigenous
- Pauridia capensis (L.) Snijman & Kocyan, indigenous
- Pauridia curculigoides (Bolus) Snijman & Kocyan, indigenous
- Pauridia etesionamibensis (U.Mull.-Doblies, Mark.Ackermann, Weigend & D.Mull.-Doblies) Snijman & Koc, indigenous
- Pauridia flaccida (Nel) Snijman & Kocyan, indigenous
- Pauridia gracilipes (Schltr.) Snijman & Kocyan, indigenous
  - Pauridia gracilipes (Schltr.) Snijman & Kocyan subsp. gracilipes, indigenous
  - Pauridia gracilipes (Schltr.) Snijman & Kocyan subsp. speciosa Snijman, indigenous
- Pauridia linearis (Andrews) Snijman & Kocyan, indigenous
- Pauridia longituba M.F.Thomps. endemic
- Pauridia maryae Snijman, indigenous
- Pauridia maximiliani (Schltr.) Snijman & Kocyan, indigenous
- Pauridia minuta (L.f.) T.Durand & Schinz, endemic
- Pauridia monophylla (Schltr. ex Baker) Snijman & Kocyan, indigenous
- Pauridia monticola Snijman, indigenous
  - Pauridia monticola Snijman subsp. monticola, indigenous
  - Pauridia monticola Snijman subsp. nubigena Snijman, indigenous
- Pauridia nana (Snijman) Snijman & Kocyan, indigenous
- Pauridia ovata (L.f.) Snijman & Kocyan, indigenous
- Pauridia pudica Snijman, indigenous
- Pauridia pusilla (Snijman) Snijman & Kocyan, indigenous
- Pauridia pygmaea Snyman & Kocyan, indigenous
- Pauridia scullyi (Baker) Snijman & Kocyan, indigenous
- Pauridia serrata (Baker) Snijman & Kocyan, indigenous
  - Pauridia serrata (Thunb.) Snijman & Kocyan subsp. serrata, indigenous
  - Pauridia serrata (Thunb.) Snijman & Kocyan var. albiflora (Nel) Snijman & Kocyan, indigenous
- Pauridia trifurcillata (Nel) Snijman & Kocyan, indigenous
- Pauridia umbraticola (Schltr.) Snijman & Kocyan, indigenous
- Pauridia verna (Hilliard & B.L.Burtt) Snijman & Kocyan, indigenous

=== Rhodohypoxis ===
Genus Rhodohypoxis:

- Rhodohypoxis baurii (Baker) Nel, indigenous
  - Rhodohypoxis baurii (Baker) Nel var. baurii, indigenous
  - Rhodohypoxis baurii (Baker) Nel var. confecta Hilliard & B.L.Burtt, indigenous
  - Rhodohypoxis baurii (Baker) Nel var. platypetala (Baker) Nel, endemic
- Rhodohypoxis deflexa Hilliard & B.L.Burtt, indigenous
- Rhodohypoxis incompta Hilliard & B.L.Burtt, indigenous
- Rhodohypoxis milloides (Baker) Hilliard & B.L.Burtt, indigenous
- Rhodohypoxis rubella (Baker) Nel, indigenous
- Rhodohypoxis thodiana (Nel) Hilliard & B.L.Burtt, indigenous

=== Saniella ===
Genus Saniella:

- Saniella occidentalis (Nel) B.L.Burtt, accepted as Pauridia alticola Snijman & Kocyan, endemic
- Saniella verna Hilliard & B.L.Burtt, accepted as Pauridia verna (Hilliard & B.L.Burtt) Snijman & Kocyan, indigenous

=== Spiloxene ===
Genus Spiloxene is now included in Pauridia.

- Spiloxene acida (Nel) Garside = Pauridia acida (Nel) Snijman & Kocyan, endemic
- Spiloxene aemulans (Nel) Garside = Pauridia aemulans (Nel) Snijman & Kocyan
- Spiloxene alba (Thunb.) Fourc. = Pauridia alba (Thunb.) Snijman & Kocyan, endemic
- Spiloxene aquatica (L.f.) Salisb. ex Fourc. = Pauridia aquatica (L.f.) Snijman & Kocyan, endemic
- Spiloxene canaliculata Garside = Pauridia canaliculata (Garside) Snijman & Kocyan, endemic
- Spiloxene capensis (L.) Garside = Pauridia capensis (L.) Snijman & Kocyan, endemic
- Spiloxene curculigoides (Bolus) Garside = Pauridia curculigoides (Bolus) Snijman & Kocyan, endemic
- Spiloxene cuspidata (Nel) Garside = Pauridia ovata (L.f.) Snijman & Kocyan
- Spiloxene declinata (Nel) Garside = Pauridia curculigoides (Bolus) Snijman & Kocyan
- Spiloxene dielsiana (Nel) Garside = Pauridia serrata subsp. serrata, endemic
- Spiloxene flaccida (Nel) Garside = Pauridia flaccida (Nel) Snijman & Kocyan, endemic
- Spiloxene gracilipes (Schltr.) Garside = Pauridia ovata (L.f.) Snijman & Kocyan
- Spiloxene linearis (Andrews) Garside = Pauridia serrata (Thunb.) Snijman & Kocyan subsp. serrata
- Spiloxene maximiliani (Schltr.) Garside = Pauridia umbraticola (Schltr.) Snijman & Kocyan
- Spiloxene minuta (L.) Fourc. accepted as Pauridia pygmaea Snyman & Kocyan, endemic
- Spiloxene monophylla (Schltr. ex Baker) Garside = Pauridia monophylla (Schltr. ex Baker) Snijman & Kocyan, endemic
- Spiloxene namaquana U.Mull.-Doblies, Mark.Ackermann, Weigend & D.Mull.-Doblies = Pauridia serrata subsp. serrata
- Spiloxene nana Snijman = Pauridia nana (Snijman) Snijman & Kocyan
- Spiloxene ovata (L.f.) Garside = Pauridia ovata (L.f.) Snijman & Kocyan, endemic
- Spiloxene pusilla Snijman = Pauridia pusilla (Snijman) Snijman & Kocyan
- Spiloxene schlechteri (Bolus) Garside = Pauridia affinis (Schult. & Schult.f.) Snijman & Kocyan, endemic
- Spiloxene scullyi (Baker) Garside = Pauridia scullyi (Baker) Snijman & Kocyan indigenous
- Spiloxene serrata (Thunb.) Garside var. albiflora (Nel) Garside = Pauridia serrata (Thunb.) Snijman & Kocyan var. albiflora (Nel) Snijman & Kocyan, endemic
- Spiloxene serrata (Thunb.) Garside var. serrata = Pauridia serrata (Thunb.) Snijman & Kocyan subsp. serrata, endemic
- Spiloxene trifurcillata (Nel) Fourc. = Pauridia trifurcillata (Nel) Snijman & Kocyan, endemic
- Spiloxene umbraticola (Schltr.) Garside = Pauridia umbraticola (Schltr.) Snijman & Kocyan, endemic

== Iridaceae ==
Family: Iridaceae, 65 genera have been recorded. Not all are necessarily currently accepted.

- Genus Acidanthera:
- Genus Afrosolen:
- Genus Agretta:
- Genus Anisanthus:
- Genus Anomatheca:
- Genus Antholyza:
- Genus Aristea:
- Genus Babiana:
- Genus Barnardiella:
- Genus Belamcanda:
- Genus Bobartia:
- Genus Chasmanthe:
- Genus Codonorhiza:
- Genus Crocosmia:
- Genus Devia:
- Genus Dierama:
- Genus Dietes:
- Genus Duthiastrum:
- Genus Ferraria:
- Genus Freesia:
- Genus Galaxia:
- Genus Geissorhiza:
- Genus Gladiolus:
- Genus Gynandriris:
- Genus Hesperantha:
- Genus Hexaglottis:
- Genus Homeria:
- Genus Homoglossum:
- Genus Houttuynia:
- Genus Hyalis:
- Genus Iris:
- Genus Ixia:
- Genus Klattia:
- Genus Lapeirousia:
- Genus Melasphaerula:
- Genus Meristostigma:
- Genus Micranthus:
- Genus Montbretia:
- Genus Moraea:
- Genus Morphixia:
- Genus Nivenia:
- Genus Nymanina:
- Genus Ovieda:
- Genus Peyrousia:
- Genus Pillansia:
- Genus Psilosiphon:
- Genus Radinosiphon:
- Genus Rheome:
- Genus Roggeveldia:
- Genus Romulea:
- Genus Schizorhiza:
- Genus Schizostylis:
- Genus Sisyrinchium:
- Genus Sophronia:
- Genus Sparaxis:
- Genus Syringodea:
- Genus Thereianthus:
- Genus Tritonia:
- Genus Tritoniopsis:
- Genus Tritonixia:
- Genus Waitzia:
- Genus Watsonia:
- Genus Witsenia:
- Genus Wuerthia:
- Genus Xenoscapa:

== Lanariaceae ==
Family: Lanariaceae,

=== Lanaria ===
Genus Lanaria:

- Lanaria lanata (L.) T.Durand & Schinz , endemic

== Orchidaceae ==
Family: Orchidaceae, 67 genera have been recorded. Not all are necessarily currently accepted.

- Genus Acampe:
- Genus Acrolophia:
- Genus Aerangis:
- Genus Aeranthus:
- Genus Angraecum:
- Genus Bartholina:
- Genus Bolusiella:
- Genus Bonatea:
- Genus Brachycorythis:
- Genus Brownleea:
- Genus Bulbophyllum:
- Genus Calanthe:
- Genus Centrostigma:
- Genus Ceratandra:
- Genus Cirrhopetalum:
- Genus Corycium:
- Genus Corymborkis:
- Genus Cymbidium:
- Genus Cynorkis:
- Genus Cyrtorchis:
- Genus Diaphananthe:
- Genus Didymoplexis:
- Genus Disa:
- Genus Disperis:
- Genus Dracomonticola:
- Genus Eulophia:
- Genus Evotella:
- Genus Gastrodia:
- Genus Habenaria:
- Genus Herschelianthe:
- Genus Holothrix:
- Genus Huttonaea:
- Genus Jumellea:
- Genus Limodorum:
- Genus Liparis:
- Genus Margelliantha:
- Genus Microcoelia:
- Genus Monadenia:
- Genus Mystacidium:
- Genus Neobolusia:
- Genus Nervilia:
- Genus Oeceoclades:
- Genus Orthochilus:
- Genus Pachites:
- Genus Platycoryne:
- Genus Platylepis:
- Genus Polystachya:
- Genus Pterygodium:
- Genus Rangaeris:
- Genus Rhipidoglossum:
- Genus Saccolabium:
- Genus Satyridium:
- Genus Satyrium:
- Genus Schizochilus:
- Genus Schizodium:
- Genus Serapia:
- Genus Serapias:
- Genus Solenangis:
- Genus Stenoglottis:
- Genus Tridactyle:
- Genus Vanilla:
- Genus Ypsilopus:
- Genus Zeuxine:

== Ruscaceae ==
Family: Ruscaceae,

=== Dracaena ===
Genus Dracaena:

- Dracaena aletriformis (Haw.) Bos, indigenous
- Dracaena mannii Baker, indigenous
- Dracaena transvaalensis Baker, endemic

=== Eriospermum ===
Genus Eriospermum:

- Eriospermum abyssinicum Baker, accepted as Eriospermum flagelliforme (Baker) J.C.Manning
- Eriospermum aequilibre Poelln. endemic
- Eriospermum alcicorne Baker, endemic
- Eriospermum algiferum A.V.Duthie, endemic
- Eriospermum aphyllum Marloth, endemic
- Eriospermum appendiculatum A.V.Duthie, endemic
- Eriospermum arachnoideum P.L.Perry, endemic
- Eriospermum arenicolum Poelln. accepted as Eriospermum paradoxum (Jacq.) Ker Gawl.
- Eriospermum arenosum P.L.Perry, endemic
- Eriospermum aribesense P.L.Perry, endemic
- Eriospermum armianum P.L.Perry, endemic
- Eriospermum attenuatum P.L.Perry, endemic
- Eriospermum avasmontanum Dinter, accepted as Eriospermum schinzii Baker
- Eriospermum bakerianum Schinz, indigenous
  - Eriospermum bakerianum Schinz subsp. bakerianum, indigenous
- Eriospermum bayeri P.L.Perry, endemic
- Eriospermum bifidum R.A.Dyer, endemic
- Eriospermum bowieanum Baker, endemic
- Eriospermum bracteatum Archibald, endemic
- Eriospermum brevipes Baker, endemic
- Eriospermum breviscapum P.L.Perry, endemic
- Eriospermum bruynsii P.L.Perry, endemic
- Eriospermum burchellii Baker, accepted as Eriospermum flagelliforme (Baker) J.C.Manning
- Eriospermum calcareum P.L.Perry, endemic
- Eriospermum capense (L.) Thunb. indigenous
  - Eriospermum capense (L.) Thunb. subsp. capense, endemic
  - Eriospermum capense (L.) Thunb. subsp. stoloniferum (Marloth) P.L.Perry, endemic
- Eriospermum cernuum Baker, endemic
- Eriospermum cervicorne Marloth, endemic
- Eriospermum ciliatum P.L.Perry, endemic
- Eriospermum coactum P.L.Perry, endemic
- Eriospermum coerulescens Poelln. accepted as Eriospermum ornithogaloides Baker
- Eriospermum confertum Baker, accepted as Eriospermum spirale Schult.
- Eriospermum confusum Poelln. accepted as Eriospermum corymbosum Baker
- Eriospermum cooperi Baker, indigenous
  - Eriospermum cooperi Baker var. cooperi, indigenous
  - Eriospermum cooperi Baker var. natalense (Baker) P.L.Perry, indigenous
- Eriospermum cordiforme Salter, endemic
- Eriospermum corymbosum Baker, indigenous
- Eriospermum crispum P.L.Perry, endemic
- Eriospermum descendens P.L.Perry, endemic
- Eriospermum deserticolum Marloth ex P.L.Perry, endemic
- Eriospermum dielsianum Poelln. indigenous
  - Eriospermum dielsianum Poelln. subsp. dielsianum, endemic
  - Eriospermum dielsianum Poelln. subsp. molle P.L.Perry, endemic
- Eriospermum dissitiflorum Schltr. endemic
- Eriospermum dregei Schonland, endemic
- Eriospermum duthieae Salter, accepted as Eriospermum cernuum Baker
- Eriospermum dyeri Archibald, endemic
- Eriospermum erinum P.L.Perry, endemic
- Eriospermum eriophorum P.L.Perry, endemic
- Eriospermum ernstii P.L.Perry, endemic
- Eriospermum exigium P.L.Perry, endemic
- Eriospermum exile P.L.Perry, endemic
- Eriospermum filicaule P.L.Perry, endemic
- Eriospermum flabellatum P.L.Perry, endemic
- Eriospermum flagelliforme (Baker) J.C.Manning, indigenous
- Eriospermum flavum P.L.Perry, endemic
- Eriospermum folioliferum Andrews, endemic
- Eriospermum fragile P.L.Perry, endemic
- Eriospermum galpinii Schinz, accepted as Eriospermum mackenii (Hook.f.) Baker subsp. galpinii (Schinz) P.L.Perry
- Eriospermum glaciale P.L.Perry, endemic
- Eriospermum graminifolium A.V.Duthie, endemic
- Eriospermum haygarthii Baker, accepted as Eriospermum ornithogaloides Baker
- Eriospermum herporrhizum Salter, accepted as Eriospermum nanum Marloth
- Eriospermum hygrophilum Baker, accepted as Eriospermum cooperi Baker var. cooperi
- Eriospermum inconspicuum P.L.Perry, endemic
- Eriospermum lanceifolium Jacq. endemic
  - Eriospermum lanceifolium Jacq. var. orthophyllum Archibald, accepted as Eriospermum orthophyllum (Archibald) P.L.Perry
- Eriospermum lanimarginatum P.L.Perry, endemic
- Eriospermum lanuginosum Jacq. endemic
- Eriospermum laxiracemosum P.L.Perry, endemic
- Eriospermum luteorubrum Baker, accepted as Eriospermum flagelliforme (Baker) J.C.Manning
- Eriospermum macgregoriorum P.L.Perry, endemic
- Eriospermum mackenii (Hook.f.) Baker, indigenous
  - Eriospermum mackenii (Hook.f.) Baker subsp. galpinii (Schinz) P.L.Perry, indigenous
  - Eriospermum mackenii (Hook.f.) Baker subsp. mackenii, indigenous
- Eriospermum macrum Poelln. accepted as Eriospermum cernuum Baker
- Eriospermum marginatum P.L.Perry, endemic
- Eriospermum minutiflorum P.L.Perry, endemic
- Eriospermum minutipustulatum P.L.Perry, endemic
- Eriospermum multifidum Marloth, endemic
- Eriospermum namaquanum P.L.Perry, endemic
- Eriospermum nanum Marloth, endemic
- Eriospermum natalense Baker, accepted as Eriospermum cooperi Baker var. natalense (Baker) P.L.Perry
- Eriospermum occultum Archibald, endemic
- Eriospermum omahekense Engl. & K.Krause, accepted as Eriospermum mackenii (Hook.f.) Baker subsp. galpinii (Schinz) P.L.Perry
- Eriospermum ornithogaloides Baker, indigenous
- Eriospermum orthophyllum (Archibald) P.L.Perry, endemic
- Eriospermum papilliferum A.V.Duthie, endemic
- Eriospermum paradoxum (Jacq.) Ker Gawl. endemic
- Eriospermum parvifolium Jacq. endemic
- Eriospermum parvulum P.L.Perry, endemic
- Eriospermum patentiflorum Schltr. endemic
- Eriospermum platyphyllum Baker, accepted as Eriospermum cooperi Baker var. natalense (Baker) P.L.Perry
- Eriospermum porphyrium Archibald, indigenous
- Eriospermum porphyrovalve Baker, indigenous
- Eriospermum proliferum Baker, endemic
- Eriospermum pubescens Jacq. endemic
- Eriospermum pumilum Salter, endemic
- Eriospermum pusillum P.L.Perry, endemic
- Eriospermum pustulatum A.V.Duthie, endemic
- Eriospermum ramosum P.L.Perry, endemic
- Eriospermum ratelpoortianum P.L.Perry, endemic
- Eriospermum reflexum Schinz, accepted as Eriospermum mackenii (Hook.f.) Baker subsp. galpinii (Schinz) P.L.Perry
- Eriospermum rhizomatum P.L.Perry, endemic
- Eriospermum roseum Schinz, indigenous
- Eriospermum sabulosum P.L.Perry, endemic
- Eriospermum schinzii Baker, indigenous
- Eriospermum schlechteri Baker, endemic
- Eriospermum spirale Schult. endemic
- Eriospermum stoloniferum Marloth, accepted as Eriospermum capense (L.) Thunb. subsp. stoloniferum (Marloth) P.L.Perry
- Eriospermum subincanum P.L.Perry, endemic
- Eriospermum subtile P.L.Perry, endemic
- Eriospermum tenellum Baker, accepted as Eriospermum porphyrovalve Baker
- Eriospermum thyrsoideum Baker, accepted as Eriospermum capense (L.) Thunb. subsp. capense
- Eriospermum titanopsoides P.L.Perry, endemic
- Eriospermum tortuosum Dammer, accepted as Eriospermum bakerianum Schinz subsp. tortuosum (Dammer) P.L.Perry
- Eriospermum tuberculatum P.L.Perry, endemic
- Eriospermum undulatum P.L.Perry, endemic
- Eriospermum vermiforme P.L.Perry, endemic
- Eriospermum villosum Baker, endemic
- Eriospermum viscosum P.L.Perry, endemic
- Eriospermum zeyheri R.A.Dyer, endemic

=== Sansevieria ===
Genus Sansevieria:

- Sansevieria aethiopica Thunb. indigenous
- Sansevieria concinna N.E.Br. indigenous
- Sansevieria hallii Chahin. indigenous
- Sansevieria hyacinthoides (L.) Druce, indigenous
- Sansevieria metallica Gerome & Labroy, indigenous
- Sansevieria pearsonii N.E.Br. indigenous

== Tecophilaeaceae ==
Family: Tecophilaeaceae,

=== Cyanella ===
Genus Cyanella:

- Cyanella alba L.f. indigenous
- Cyanella alba L.f. subsp. alba, endemic
- Cyanella alba L.f. subsp. flavescens J.C.Manning, indigenous
- Cyanella alba L.f. subsp. minor J.C.Manning, indigenous
- Cyanella aquatica Oberm. ex G.Scott, endemic
- Cyanella cygnea G.Scott, endemic
- Cyanella hyacinthoides Royen ex L. endemic
- Cyanella lineata Burch. accepted as Cyanella lutea L.f. subsp. rosea (Eckl. ex Baker) J.C.Manning & Goldblatt
- Cyanella lutea L.f. indigenous
- Cyanella lutea L.f. forma angustior Zahlbr. accepted as Cyanella lutea L.f. subsp. lutea
- Cyanella lutea L.f. var. rosea Eckl. ex Baker, accepted as Cyanella lutea L.f. subsp. rosea (Eckl. ex Baker) J.C.Manning & Goldblatt
- Cyanella marlothii J.C.Manning & Goldblatt, indigenous
- Cyanella odoratissima Ker Gawl. accepted as Cyanella lutea L.f. subsp. rosea (Eckl. ex Baker) J.C.Manning & Goldblatt
- Cyanella orchidiformis Jacq. endemic
- Cyanella pentheri Zahlbr. accepted as Cyanella hyacinthoides Royen ex L.
- Cyanella racemosa Schinz, accepted as Cyanella lutea L.f. subsp. lutea
- Cyanella ramosissima (Engl. & K.Krause) Engl. & K.Krause, indigenous

=== Walleria ===
Genus Walleria:

- Walleria armata Schltr. & K.Krause, accepted as Walleria gracilis (Salisb.) S.Carter
- Walleria gracilis (Salisb.) S.Carter, indigenous
- Walleria nutans J.Kirk, indigenous
