= Hessea breviflora =

Scientific classification
- Kingdom: Plantae
- Clade: Tracheophytes
- Clade: Angiosperms
- Clade: Monocots
- Order: Asparagales
- Family: Amaryllidaceae
- Subfamily: Amaryllidoideae
- Genus: Hessea
- Species: H. breviflora

Binomial name
- Hessea breviflora Herb.

Synonyms
- Hessea bachmanniana Schinz; Hessea brachyscypha Baker; Hessea dregeana Kunth; Hessea longituba D.Müll.-Doblies & U.Müll.-Doblies; Hessea zeyheri Baker; Periphanes brachyscypha (Baker) F.M.Leight.; Periphanes dregeana (Kunth) F.M.Leight.; Periphanes zeyheri (Baker) F.M.Leight.

Species of flowering plant

Hessea breviflora, commonly known as the match sambreeltjie, is a perennial flowering plant and geophyte belonging to the genus Hessea. The species is endemic to the Northern Cape and the Western Cape.
