= Tulbaghia tenuior =

Scientific classification
- Kingdom: Plantae
- Clade: Embryophytes
- Clade: Tracheophytes
- Clade: Spermatophytes
- Clade: Angiosperms
- Clade: Monocots
- Order: Asparagales
- Family: Amaryllidaceae
- Subfamily: Allioideae
- Genus: Tulbaghia
- Species: T. tenuior

Binomial name
- Tulbaghia tenuior K.Krause & Dinter

Synonyms
- Tulbaghia karasbergensis R.Glover

Species of flowering plant

Tulbaghia tenuior is a geophyte belonging to the Amaryllidaceae family. The species is native to Namibia and the Northern Cape.
