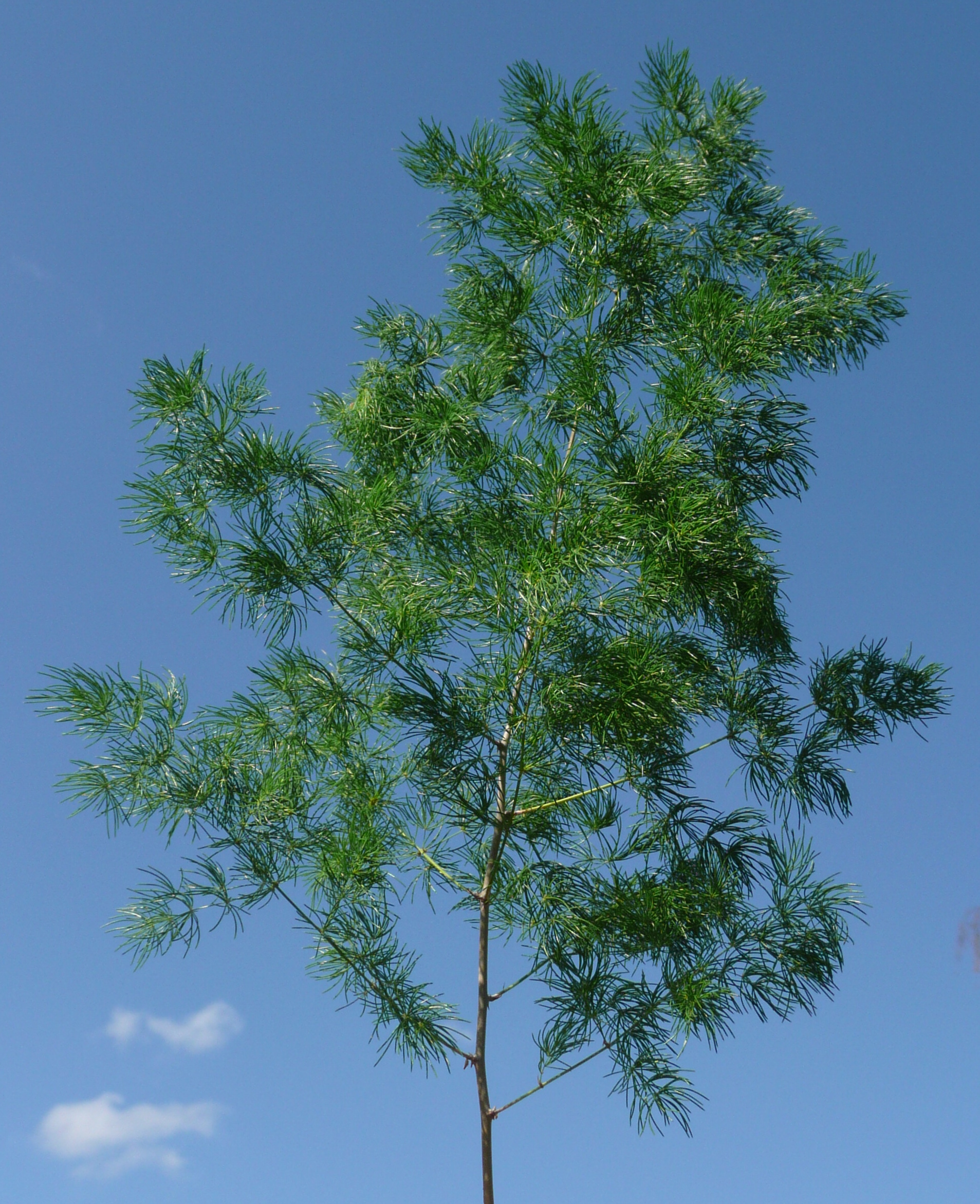

Scientific classification
- Kingdom: Plantae
- Clade: Tracheophytes
- Clade: Angiosperms
- Clade: Monocots
- Order: Asparagales
- Family: Asparagaceae
- Subfamily: Asparagoideae
- Genus: Asparagus
- Species: A. retrofractus

Binomial name
- Asparagus retrofractus L.

= Asparagus retrofractus =

Species of shrub

Asparagus retrofractus ("Ming Asparagus fern") is a shrub of the Asparagus genus that is indigenous to the western regions of South Africa.

== Description ==
A large, spreading, tangled shrub. Asparagus retrofractus has long scrambling-climbing, light-grey, zig-zagged stems.

The bases of the stems are erect, thick and silver-coloured.

The tips of the stems and the outer branches are slender, silver and zig-zagged. It lacks spines on its outer (final) branches, but sometimes has some highly recurved spines on its main branches.

Older stems lose their silver, grooved outer covering, and become brown and smooth.

The leaves are linear or needle-like, 10-30mm long, arcuate and appear in gracile tufts.

The fruits are small (7mm diameter), stalked, pendulous green berries, becoming orange when ripe. The roots are fibrous.

== Distribution ==
This species is indigenous to the dry, western regions of South Africa. It occurs from Namibia in the north, across the Northern Cape Province, as far south as Cape Town, Caledon, Worcester and Montagu, in the western (winter rainfall) portion of the Western Cape Province. It favours rocky, sandy habitats, and is especially common in river valleys.
