= Strumaria aestivalis =

Scientific classification
- Kingdom: Plantae
- Clade: Tracheophytes
- Clade: Angiosperms
- Clade: Monocots
- Order: Asparagales
- Family: Amaryllidaceae
- Subfamily: Amaryllidoideae
- Genus: Strumaria
- Species: S. aestivalis

Binomial name
- Strumaria aestivalis Snijman

Synonyms
- Bokkeveldia aestivalis (Snijman) D.Müll.-Doblies & U.Müll.-Doblies

Species of flowering plant

Strumaria aestivalis is a perennial flowering plant and geophyte belonging to the genus Strumaria. The species is endemic to the Northern Cape and occurs at Loeriesfontein. It has a range of 625 km^{2} and there are three subpopulations. The plant is threatened by uncontrolled flower collectors.
