= Hypoxis villosa =

Scientific classification
- Kingdom: Plantae
- Clade: Tracheophytes
- Clade: Angiosperms
- Clade: Monocots
- Order: Asparagales
- Family: Hypoxidaceae
- Genus: Hypoxis
- Species: H. villosa

Binomial name
- Hypoxis villosa L.f.

Species of flowering plant

Hypoxis villosa is a plant species in the Hypoxidaceae, formerly included in the Liliaceae or Amaryllidaceae. It is native to southern Africa – South Africa (Cape Provinces and KwaZulu-Natal), Lesotho, and Eswatini.
