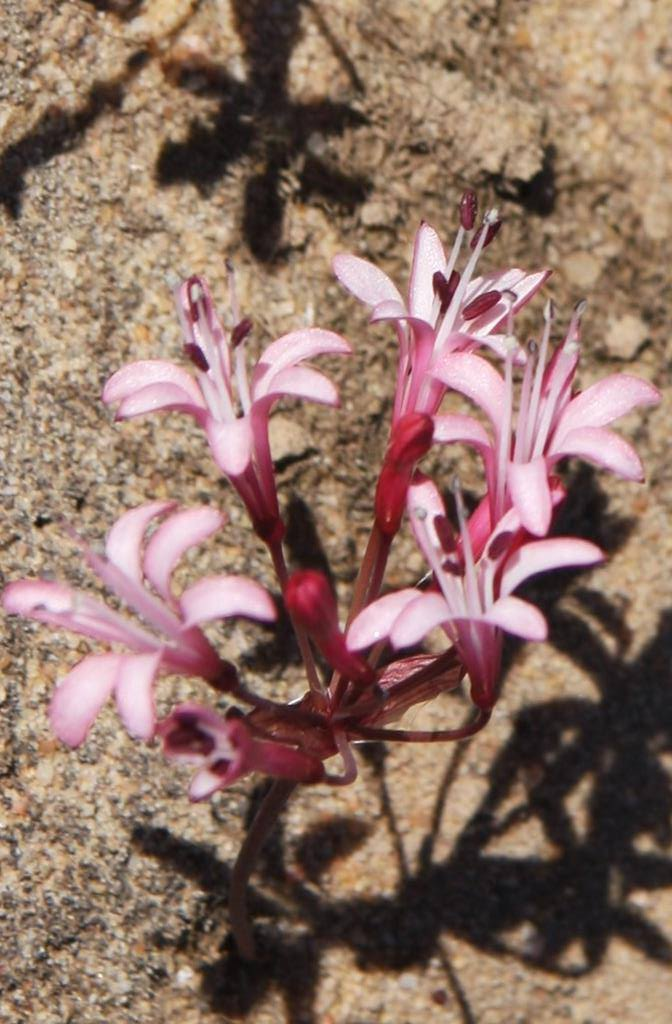

Scientific classification
- Kingdom: Plantae
- Clade: Tracheophytes
- Clade: Angiosperms
- Clade: Monocots
- Order: Asparagales
- Family: Amaryllidaceae
- Subfamily: Amaryllidoideae
- Genus: Strumaria
- Species: S. watermeyeri

Binomial name
- Strumaria watermeyeri L.Bolus

Synonyms
- Bokkeveldia watermeyeri (L.Bolus) D.Müll.-Doblies & U.Müll.-Doblies

= Strumaria watermeyeri =

Species of flowering plant

Strumaria watermeyeri is a species of flowering plant in the family Amaryllidaceae, native to the Cape Provinces of South Africa, where it is found in dry areas in the northwest. It is usually solitary, and has pink or white flowers. It was first described by Louisa Bolus in 1921.

== Subspecies ==
Two subspecies are recognized:

- Strumaria watermeyeri subsp. botterkloofensis (D.Müll.-Doblies & U.Müll.-Doblies) Snijman
- Strumaria watermeyeri subsp. watermayeri
