= Asparagus longicladus =

Scientific classification
- Kingdom: Plantae
- Clade: Tracheophytes
- Clade: Angiosperms
- Clade: Monocots
- Order: Asparagales
- Family: Asparagaceae
- Subfamily: Asparagoideae
- Genus: Asparagus
- Species: A. longicladus

Binomial name
- Asparagus longicladus N.E.Br.

Species of flowering plant

Asparagus longicladus is a species of flowering plant in the family Asparagaceae, native to Mozambique, Zimbabwe, Botswana and the Caprivi Strip.
