= Hessea pulcherrima =

Scientific classification
- Kingdom: Plantae
- Clade: Tracheophytes
- Clade: Angiosperms
- Clade: Monocots
- Order: Asparagales
- Family: Amaryllidaceae
- Subfamily: Amaryllidoideae
- Genus: Hessea
- Species: H. pulcherrima

Binomial name
- Hessea pulcherrima (D.Müll.-Doblies & U.Müll.-Doblies) Snijman

Synonyms
- Dewinterella pulcherrima (D.Müll.-Doblies & U.Müll.-Doblies) D.Müll.-Doblies & U.Müll.-Doblies; Gemmaria pulcherrima D.Müll.-Doblies & U.Müll.-Doblies

Species of flowering plant

Hessea pulcherrima is a perennial flowering plant and geophyte that belongs to the genus Hessea and is part of the fynbos. The species is endemic to the Northern Cape and occurs on the Bokkeveldberge escarpment. The plant has given up its habitat to grain cultivation but the process has been stopped. The population is stable and the plant is considered rare.
