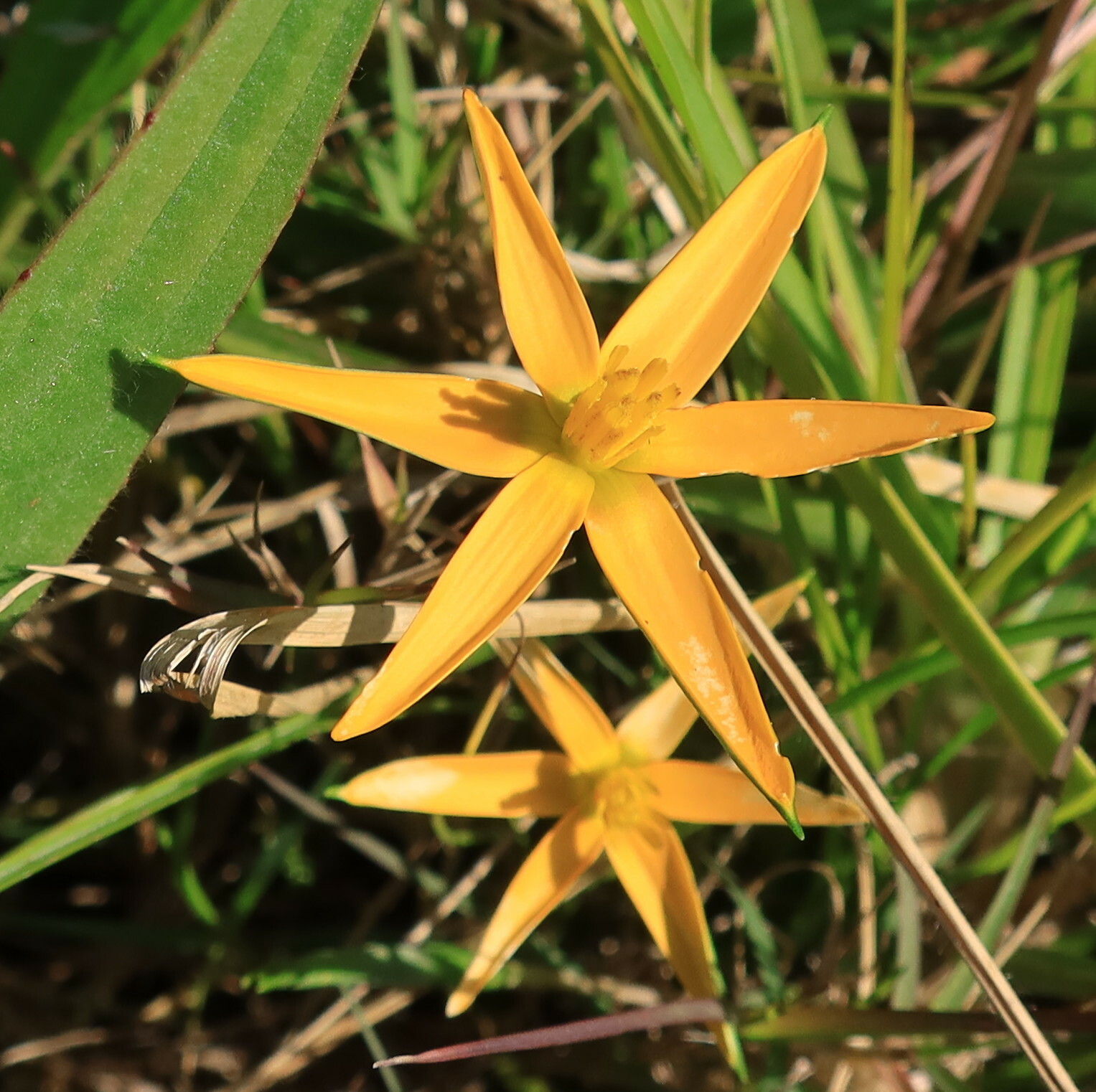

Scientific classification
- Kingdom: Plantae
- Clade: Tracheophytes
- Clade: Angiosperms
- Clade: Monocots
- Order: Asparagales
- Family: Hypoxidaceae
- Genus: Pauridia
- Species: P. serrata

Binomial name
- Pauridia serrata (Thunb.) Snijman & Kocyan

= Pauridia serrata =

Species of plant

Pauridia serrata is a species of flowering plant from the genus Pauridia.

== Taxonomy ==
Pauridia serrata contains the following subspecies:

- Pauridia serrata subsp. serrata
- Pauridia serrata subsp. albiflora
