= Tulbaghia maritima =

Scientific classification
- Kingdom: Plantae
- Clade: Embryophytes
- Clade: Tracheophytes
- Clade: Spermatophytes
- Clade: Angiosperms
- Clade: Monocots
- Order: Asparagales
- Family: Amaryllidaceae
- Subfamily: Allioideae
- Genus: Tulbaghia
- Species: T. maritima

Binomial name
- Tulbaghia maritima Vosa

Species of flowering plant

Tulbaghia maritima is a geophyte belonging to the Amaryllidaceae family. The species is endemic to the Eastern Cape and occurs from Nature's Valley to the Gamtoos River Estuary. It has a range of 1046 km² and there are fewer than ten subpopulations remaining. The plant continues to lose habitat to coastal development.
