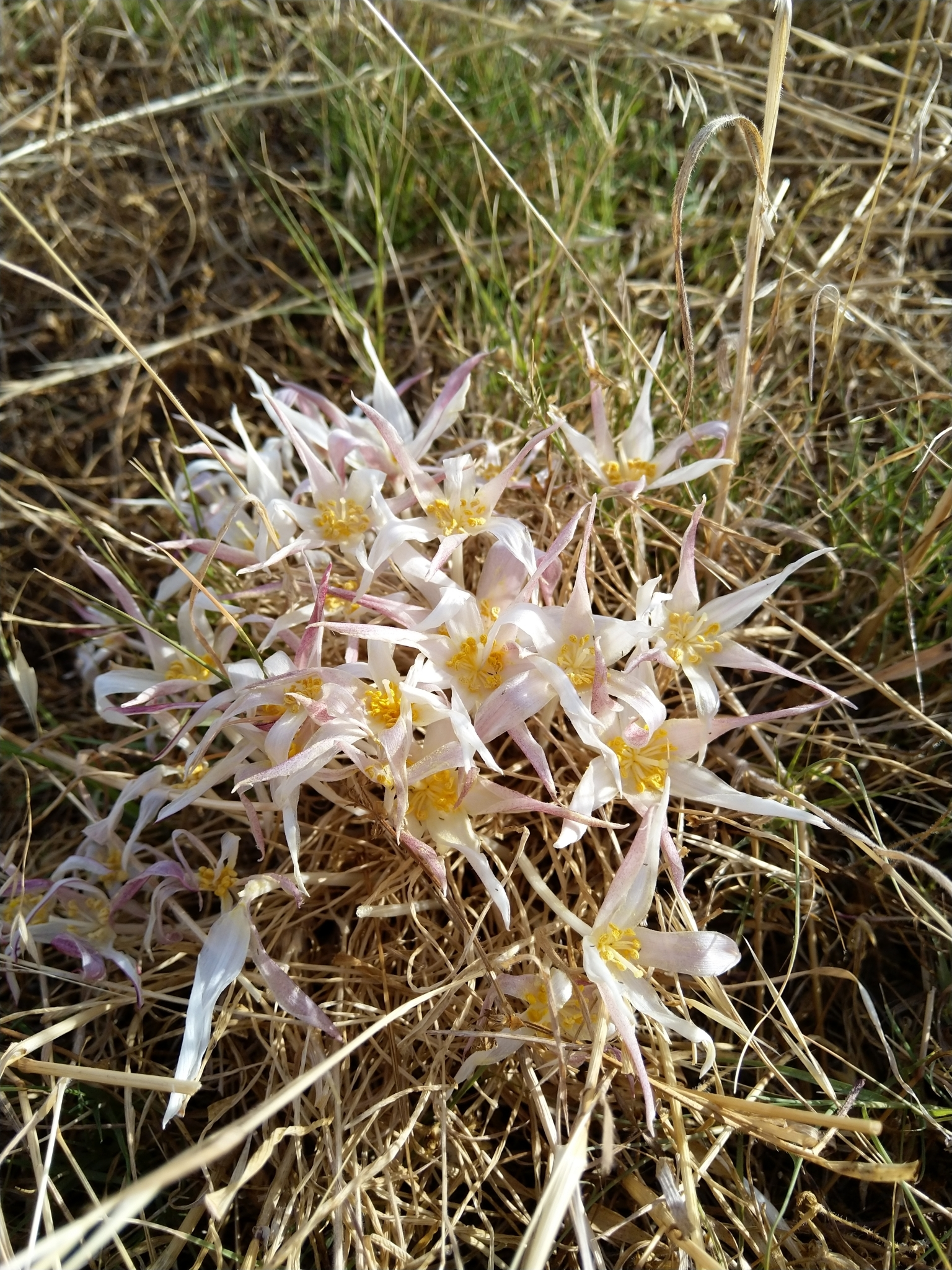

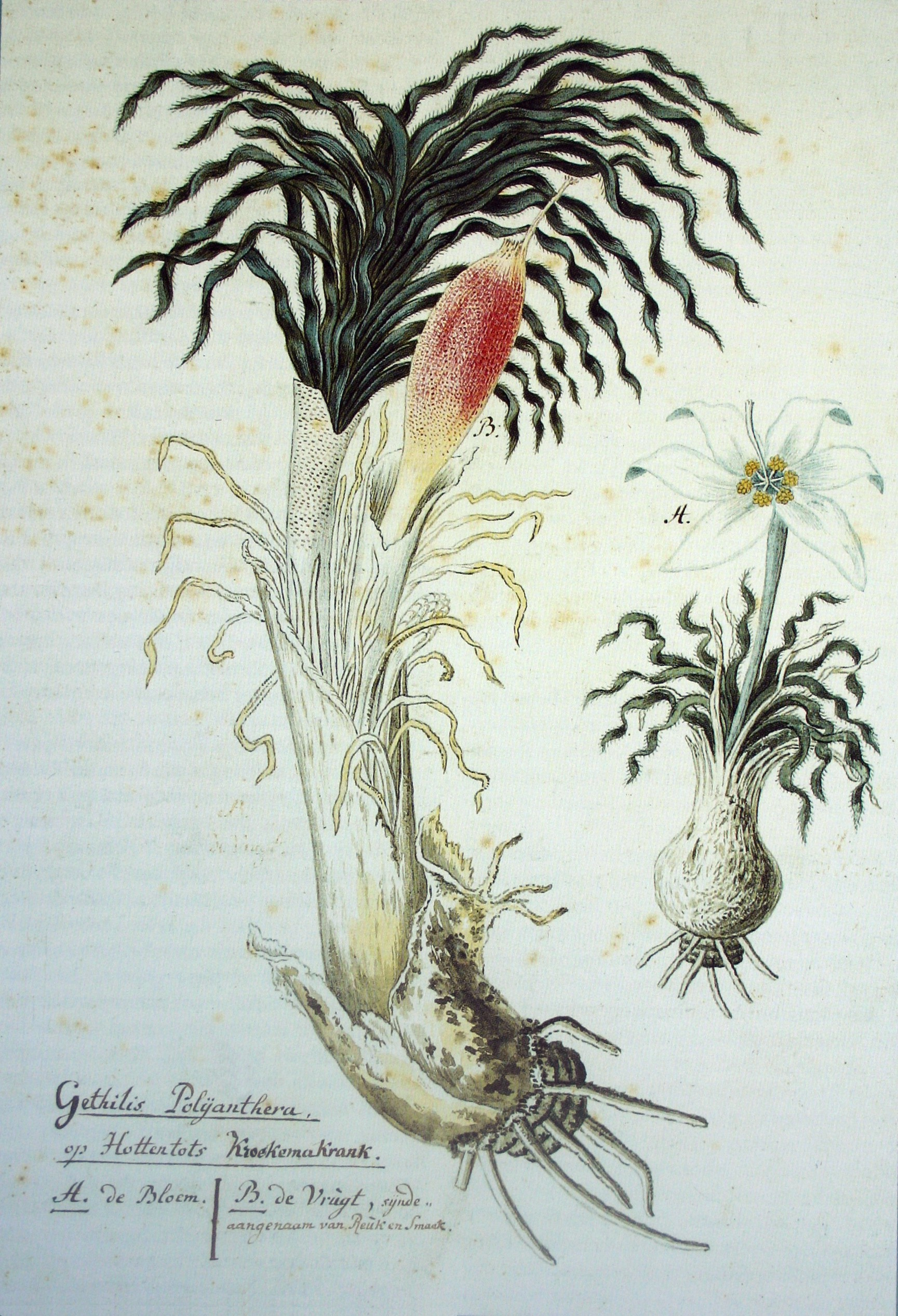

Scientific classification
- Kingdom: Plantae
- Clade: Tracheophytes
- Clade: Angiosperms
- Clade: Monocots
- Order: Asparagales
- Family: Amaryllidaceae
- Subfamily: Amaryllidoideae
- Genus: Gethyllis
- Species: G. ciliaris

Binomial name
- Gethyllis ciliaris (Thunb.) Thunb.

Synonyms
- Papiria ciliaris Thunb.

= Gethyllis ciliaris =

Species of plant

Gethyllis ciliaris, commonly known as the Hottentots-koekemakranka, Hotnotskoekoemakranka or hairy kukumakranka, is a perennial geophyte belonging to the genus Gethyllis and is part of the fynbos. The species is endemic to the Western Cape and occurs from Clanwilliam to the Cape Peninsula. The plant has lost approximately 25% of its habitat to crop cultivation, invasive plants and coastal development over the past 70 years.

The plant has two subspecies:

- Gethyllis ciliaris subsp. ciliaris
- Gethyllis ciliaris subsp. longituba (L.Bolus) D.Müll.-Doblies
