= Strumaria pubescens =

Scientific classification
- Kingdom: Plantae
- Clade: Tracheophytes
- Clade: Angiosperms
- Clade: Monocots
- Order: Asparagales
- Family: Amaryllidaceae
- Subfamily: Amaryllidoideae
- Genus: Strumaria
- Species: S. pubescens

Binomial name
- Strumaria pubescens W.F.Barker

Synonyms
- Bokkeveldia pubescens (W.F.Barker) D.Müll.-Doblies & U.Müll.-Doblies

Species of flowering plant

Strumaria pubescens is a perennial flowering plant and geophyte belonging to the genus Strumaria and is part of the fynbos. The species is endemic to the Northern Cape and Western Cape. It occurs on the southern Roggeveld Mountains escarpment. The population is stable and the plant is considered rare.
