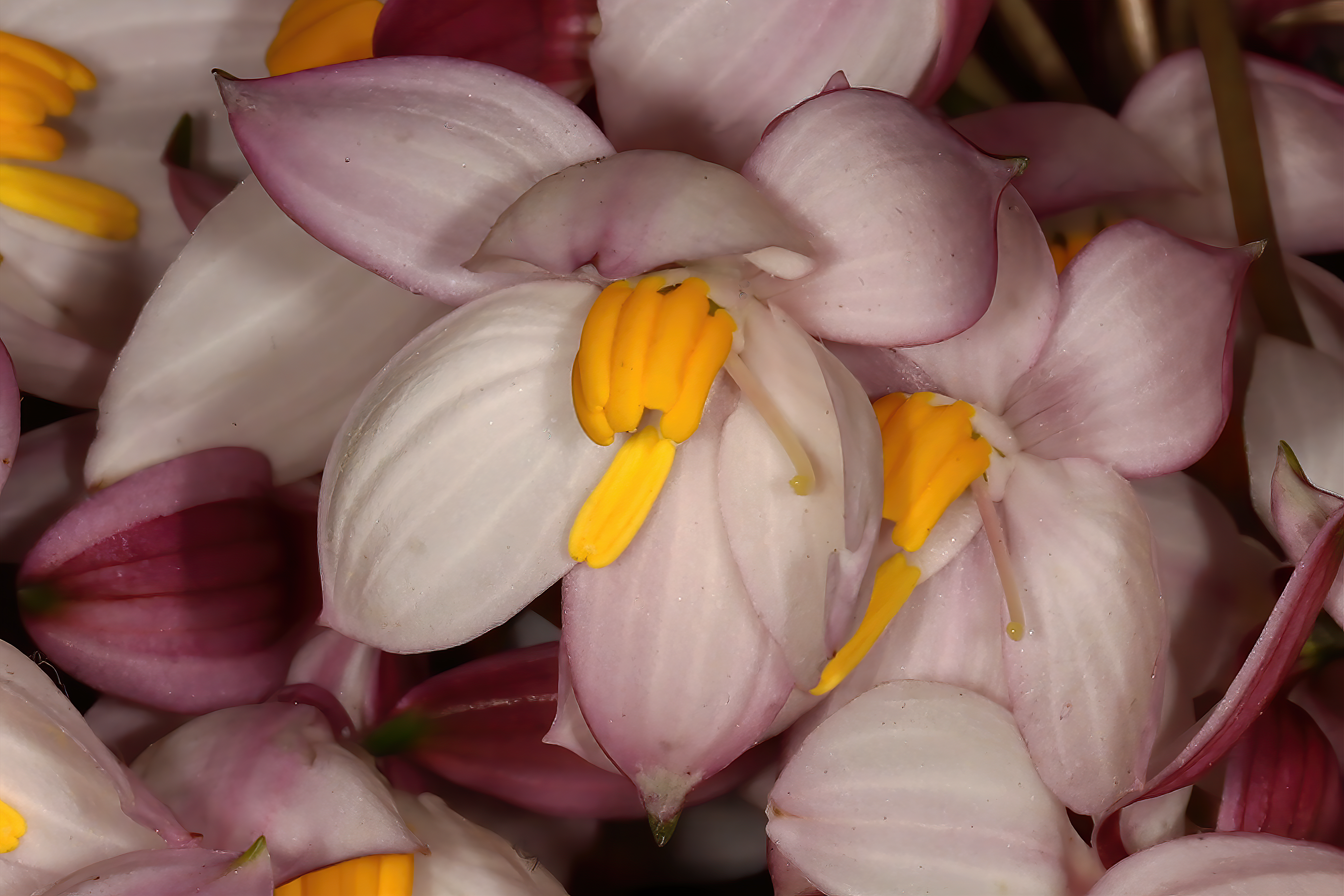

Scientific classification
- Kingdom: Plantae
- Clade: Tracheophytes
- Clade: Angiosperms
- Clade: Monocots
- Order: Asparagales
- Family: Tecophilaeaceae
- Genus: Cyanella
- Species: C. alba

Binomial name
- Cyanella alba L.f.

= Cyanella alba =

Species of flowering plant

Cyanella alba, the lady's hand or toe-toe-uintjie, is a perennial flowering plant and geophyte belonging to the genus Cyanella and is part of the fynbos. The plant is endemic to the Northern Cape and the Western Cape and occurs on the Bokkeveld escarpment. The plant flowers in August, September and October.
