= Brunsvigia pulchra =

Scientific classification
- Kingdom: Plantae
- Clade: Tracheophytes
- Clade: Angiosperms
- Clade: Monocots
- Order: Asparagales
- Family: Amaryllidaceae
- Subfamily: Amaryllidoideae
- Genus: Brunsvigia
- Species: B. pulchra

Binomial name
- Brunsvigia pulchra (W.F.Barker) D.Müll.-Doblies & U.Müll.-Doblies

Synonyms
- Boophone pulchra W.F.Barker

Species of flowering plant

Brunsvigia pulchra, commonly known as the Namaqualand tulip or torch candelabra, is a geophyte belonging to the Amaryllidaceae family. The species is endemic to the Northern Cape and occurs from Kamiesberge to Steinkopf. It is part of the fynbos and Succulent Karoo vegetation. The plant is considered rare.
