= Strumaria karoopoortensis =

Scientific classification
- Kingdom: Plantae
- Clade: Tracheophytes
- Clade: Angiosperms
- Clade: Monocots
- Order: Asparagales
- Family: Amaryllidaceae
- Subfamily: Amaryllidoideae
- Genus: Strumaria
- Species: S. karoopoortensis

Binomial name
- Strumaria karoopoortensis (D.Müll.-Doblies & U.Müll.-Doblies) Snijman

Species of flowering plant

Strumaria karoopoortensis is a perennial flowering plant and geophyte belonging to the genus Strumaria. The species is endemic to the Western Cape. It occurs from the southern Tankwa Karoo to the Anysberg. There are two subpopulations that together have less than 1000 plants.
