= Strumaria leipoldtii =

Scientific classification
- Kingdom: Plantae
- Clade: Tracheophytes
- Clade: Angiosperms
- Clade: Monocots
- Order: Asparagales
- Family: Amaryllidaceae
- Subfamily: Amaryllidoideae
- Genus: Strumaria
- Species: S. leipoldtii

Binomial name
- Strumaria leipoldtii (L.Bolus) Snijman

Synonyms
- Gemmaria leipoldtii (L.Bolus) D.Müll.-Doblies & U.Müll.-Doblies; Hessea leipoldtii L.Bolus; Periphanes leipoldtii (L.Bolus) F.M.Leight.

Species of flowering plant

Strumaria leipoldtii is a perennial flowering plant and geophyte belonging to the genus Strumaria. The species is endemic to the Western Cape and occurs at Lamberts Bay. There is one population with approximately 200 plants. The plant is threatened by quarrying.
