= Strumaria merxmuelleriana =

Scientific classification
- Kingdom: Plantae
- Clade: Tracheophytes
- Clade: Angiosperms
- Clade: Monocots
- Order: Asparagales
- Family: Amaryllidaceae
- Subfamily: Amaryllidoideae
- Genus: Strumaria
- Species: S. merxmuelleriana

Binomial name
- Strumaria merxmuelleriana (D.Müll.-Doblies & U.Müll.-Doblies) Snijman

Synonyms
- Gemmaria merxmuelleriana D.Müll.-Doblies & U.Müll.-Doblies

Species of flowering plant

Strumaria merxmuelleriana is a perennial flowering plant and geophyte belonging to the genus Strumaria and is part of the Succulent Karoo. The species is endemic to the Northern Cape and occurs in northern Namaqualand at Springbok and Steinkopf. The plant is considered rare.
