= Crossyne flava =

Scientific classification
- Kingdom: Plantae
- Clade: Tracheophytes
- Clade: Angiosperms
- Clade: Monocots
- Order: Asparagales
- Family: Amaryllidaceae
- Subfamily: Amaryllidoideae
- Genus: Crossyne
- Species: C. flava

Binomial name
- Crossyne flava (W.F.Barker ex Snijman) D.Müll.-Doblies & U.Müll.-Doblies

Synonyms
- Boophone flava W.F.Barker ex Snijman

Species of flowering plant

Crossyne flava, commonly known as the yellow parasol lily, is a perennial, flower-bearing plant and geophyte that is part of the Amaryllidaceae family. The plant is endemic to the Northern and Western Cape.
