= Strumaria unguiculata =

Scientific classification
- Kingdom: Plantae
- Clade: Tracheophytes
- Clade: Angiosperms
- Clade: Monocots
- Order: Asparagales
- Family: Amaryllidaceae
- Subfamily: Amaryllidoideae
- Genus: Strumaria
- Species: S. unguiculata

Binomial name
- Strumaria unguiculata (W.F.Barker) Snijman

Species of flowering plant

Strumaria unguiculata is a plant species endemic to Western Cape Province in South Africa.
