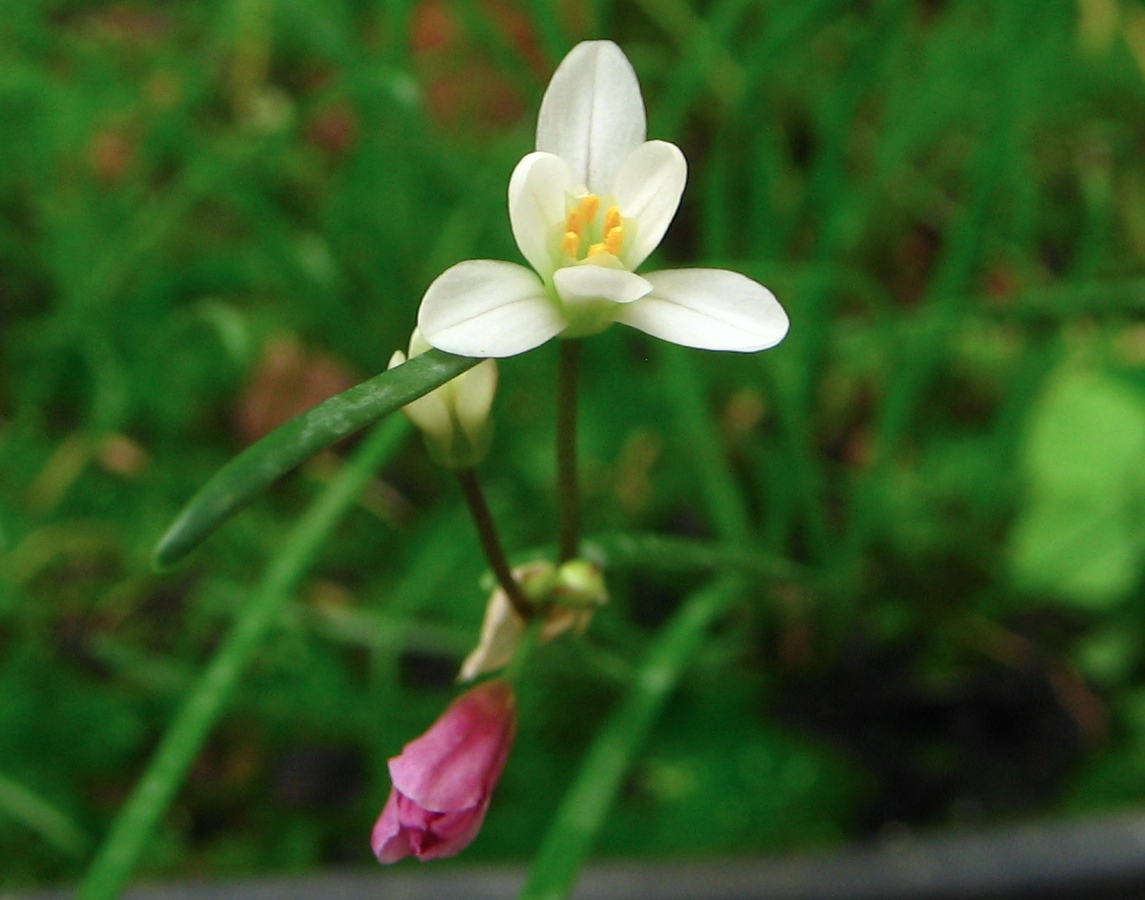

Conservation status
- Endangered (SANBI Red List)

Scientific classification
- Kingdom: Plantae
- Clade: Embryophytes
- Clade: Tracheophytes
- Clade: Spermatophytes
- Clade: Angiosperms
- Clade: Monocots
- Order: Asparagales
- Family: Amaryllidaceae
- Subfamily: Allioideae
- Tribe: Tulbaghieae
- Genus: Tulbaghia
- Species: T. siebertii

Binomial name
- Tulbaghia siebertii (Vosa) Mich.Möller & G.I.Stafford (2016)

Synonyms
- Prototulbaghia siebertii Vosa (2007)

= Tulbaghia siebertii =

Genus of plants

Tulbaghia siebertii is a species of flowering plant native to South Africa. It was described in 2007 from the Leolo Mountains of Limpopo Province as Prototulbaghia siebertii.

It is very rare, with a limited range of less than 5 square kilometres (1.9 sq mi) and threatened by grazing, mining, and road construction.
