= Strumaria picta =

Scientific classification
- Kingdom: Plantae
- Clade: Tracheophytes
- Clade: Angiosperms
- Clade: Monocots
- Order: Asparagales
- Family: Amaryllidaceae
- Subfamily: Amaryllidoideae
- Genus: Strumaria
- Species: S. picta

Binomial name
- Strumaria picta W.F.Barker

Synonyms
- Bokkeveldia picta (W.F.Barker) D.Müll.-Doblies & U.Müll.-Doblies

Species of flowering plant

Strumaria picta is a perennial flowering plant and geophyte belonging to the genus Strumaria and is part of the fynbos and the Succulent Karoo. The species is endemic to the Northern Cape and occurs on the Bokkeveldberge escarpment. The plant is considered rare.
