= Brunsvigia striata =

Scientific classification
- Kingdom: Plantae
- Clade: Tracheophytes
- Clade: Angiosperms
- Clade: Monocots
- Order: Asparagales
- Family: Amaryllidaceae
- Subfamily: Amaryllidoideae
- Genus: Brunsvigia
- Species: B. striata

Binomial name
- Brunsvigia striata W.T.Aiton

Species of flowering plant

Brunsvigia striata, commonly known as the Maartblom or Kleinmaartblom and known by its synonym Brunsvigia minor, is a small, deciduous bulbous plant endemic to South Africa, specifically the Western and Eastern Cape. It produces vibrant, fragrant, pink to deep-rose striped flowers in a spherical, umbrella-like cluster from March to April. The species thrives in sandy, rocky terrain and is commonly cultivated as a pot plant for dry, sunny climates.
