= Chlorophytum acutum =

Conservation status
- Least Concern (IUCN 3.1)

Scientific classification
- Kingdom: Plantae
- Clade: Embryophytes
- Clade: Tracheophytes
- Clade: Angiosperms
- Clade: Monocots
- Order: Asparagales
- Family: Asparagaceae
- Subfamily: Agavoideae
- Genus: Chlorophytum
- Species: C. acutum

Binomial name
- Chlorophytum acutum Nordal & C.H. Wright

Species of plant

Chlorophytum acutum is a plant native to South Africa and Lesotho. Its common name in Zulu is iphamba. It most commonly grows in and around grassveld. Its conservation status is Least Concern.
