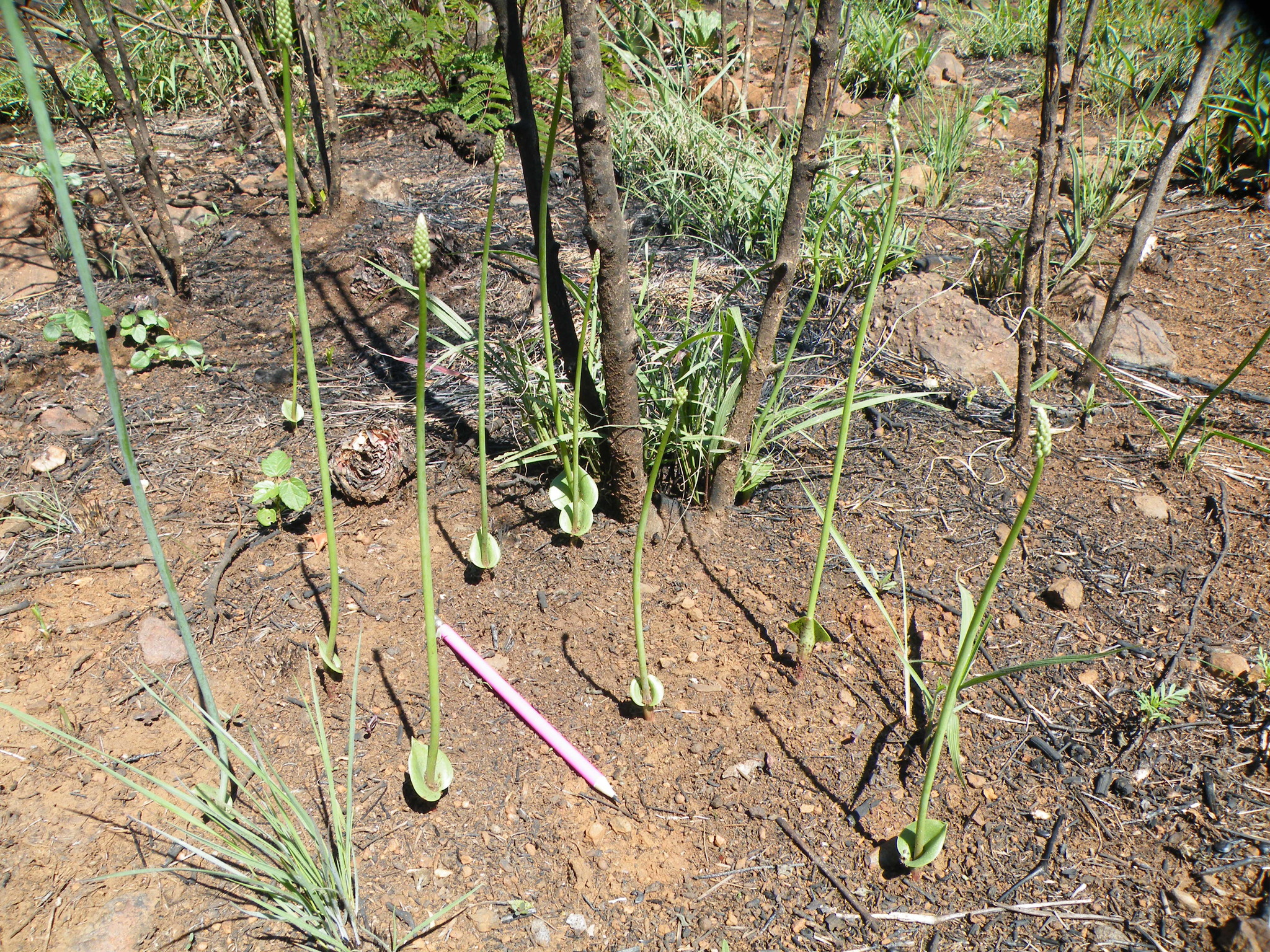
- White Woolseed (Eriospermum cooperi)

Scientific classification
- Kingdom: Plantae
- Clade: Tracheophytes
- Clade: Angiosperms
- Clade: Monocots
- Order: Asparagales
- Family: Asparagaceae
- Subfamily: Nolinoideae
- Genus: Eriospermum
- Species: E. cooperi

Binomial name
- Eriospermum cooperi Baker

= Eriospermum cooperi =

Species of flowering plant

Eriospermum cooperi is a species of flowering plant of the Asparagaceae family. It is a summer rainfall species found in rocky grassland and open scrub from the Eastern Cape, South Africa to Zimbabwe. It has a solitary erect leaf, white to pale green flowers and grows to 60 cm. The outer tepals are sometimes reddish brown.
