= Strumaria massoniella =

Scientific classification
- Kingdom: Plantae
- Clade: Tracheophytes
- Clade: Angiosperms
- Clade: Monocots
- Order: Asparagales
- Family: Amaryllidaceae
- Subfamily: Amaryllidoideae
- Genus: Strumaria
- Species: S. massoniella

Binomial name
- Strumaria massoniella (D.Müll.-Doblies & U.Müll.-Doblies) Snijman

Synonyms
- Gemmaria massoniella D.Müll.-Doblies & U.Müll.-Doblies

Species of flowering plant

Strumaria massoniella is a species of flowering plant in the family Amaryllidaceae, native to the Cape Provinces of South Africa. It was first described in 1985 as Gemmaria massoniella. Its bulb is solitary. Like other members of the genus Strumaria it has star-shaped flowers. In the Northern Cape Province, it is found in sandy plains at an elevation of about 1,000 m (3,300 ft).
