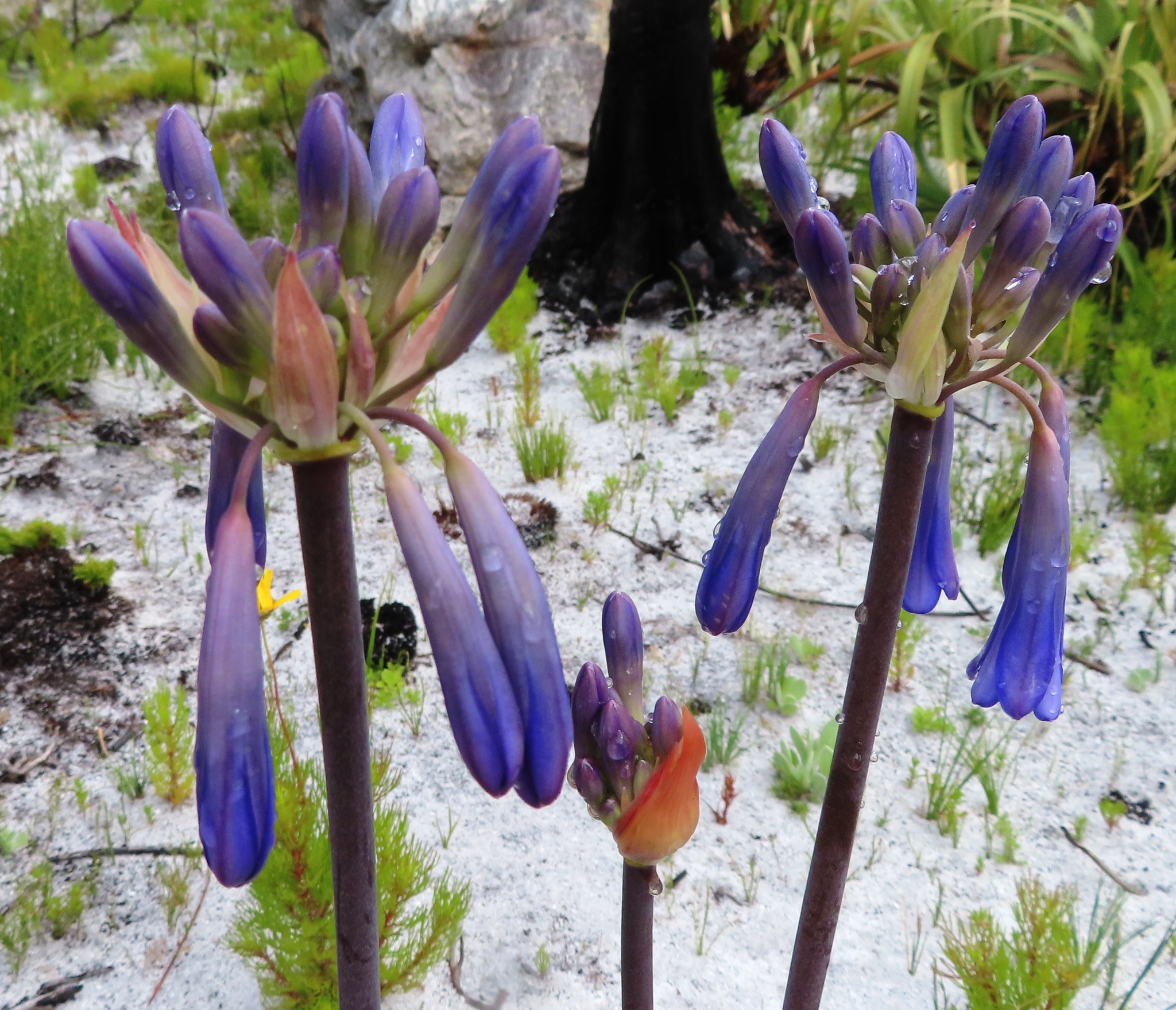

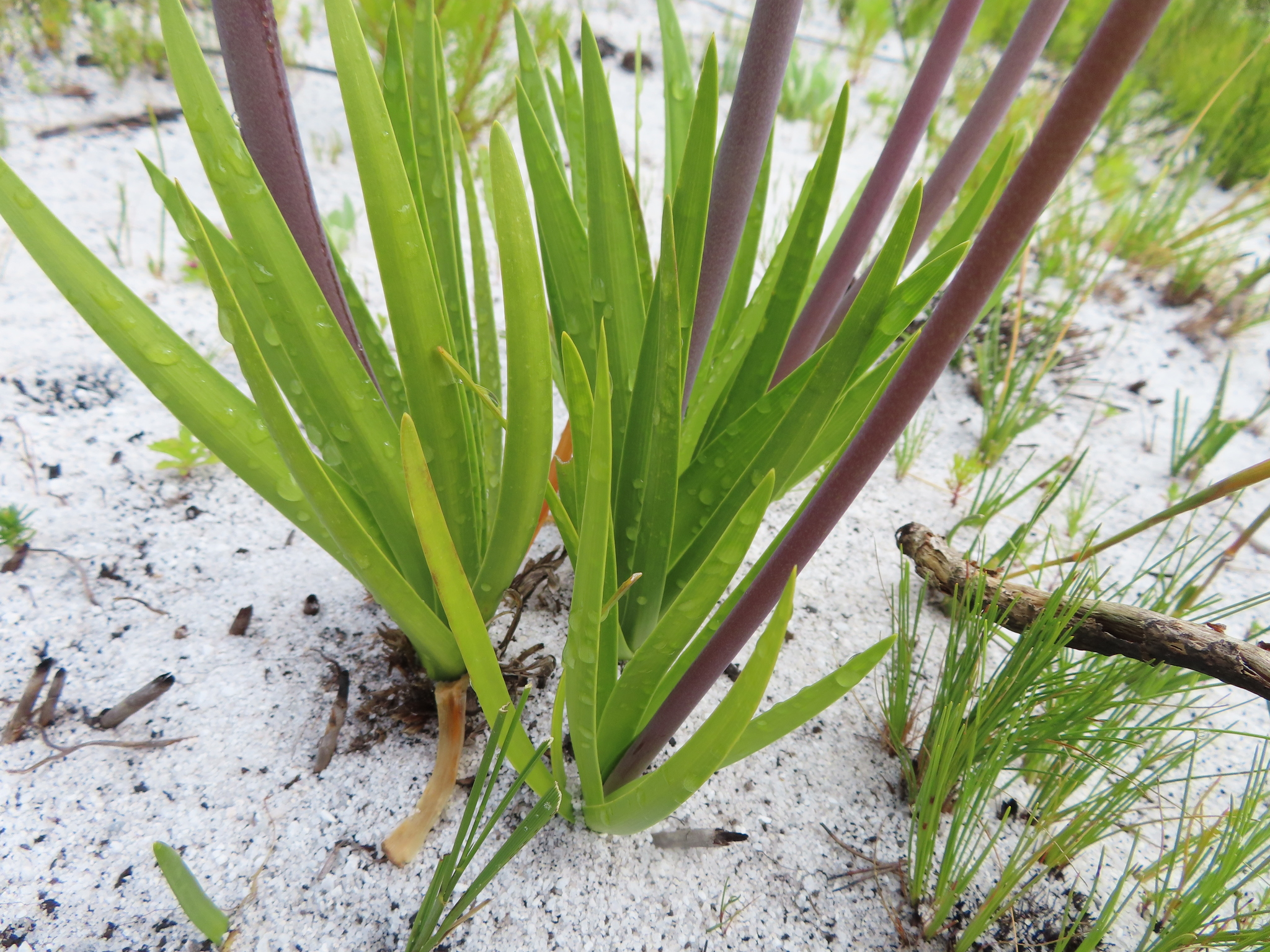

Conservation status
- Endangered (SANBI Red List)

Scientific classification
- Kingdom: Plantae
- Clade: Tracheophytes
- Clade: Angiosperms
- Clade: Monocots
- Order: Asparagales
- Family: Amaryllidaceae
- Subfamily: Agapanthoideae
- Genus: Agapanthus
- Species: A. walshii

Binomial name
- Agapanthus walshii L.Bolus

Synonyms
- Agapanthus africanus (L.) Hoffmanns. subsp. walshii (L.Bolus) Zonn. & G.D.Duncan

= Agapanthus walshii =

Species of flowering plant endemic to South Africa

Agapanthus walshii, the Cape or fynbos agapanthus, is an endangered flowering plant in the family Amaryllidaceae restricted to the Western Cape, South Africa.

== Distribution ==
Agapanthus walshii is found within a small area of the Elgin Valley, with an extent of occurrence of 35km^{2}.

== Habitat and ecology ==
Agapanthus walshii is found in Kogelberg Sandstone Fynbos habitat.

== Conservation status ==
Agapanthus walshii has been classified as endangered by SANBI in the Red List of South African Plants due to its restricted range, loss of habitat due to encroaching informal settlements.
