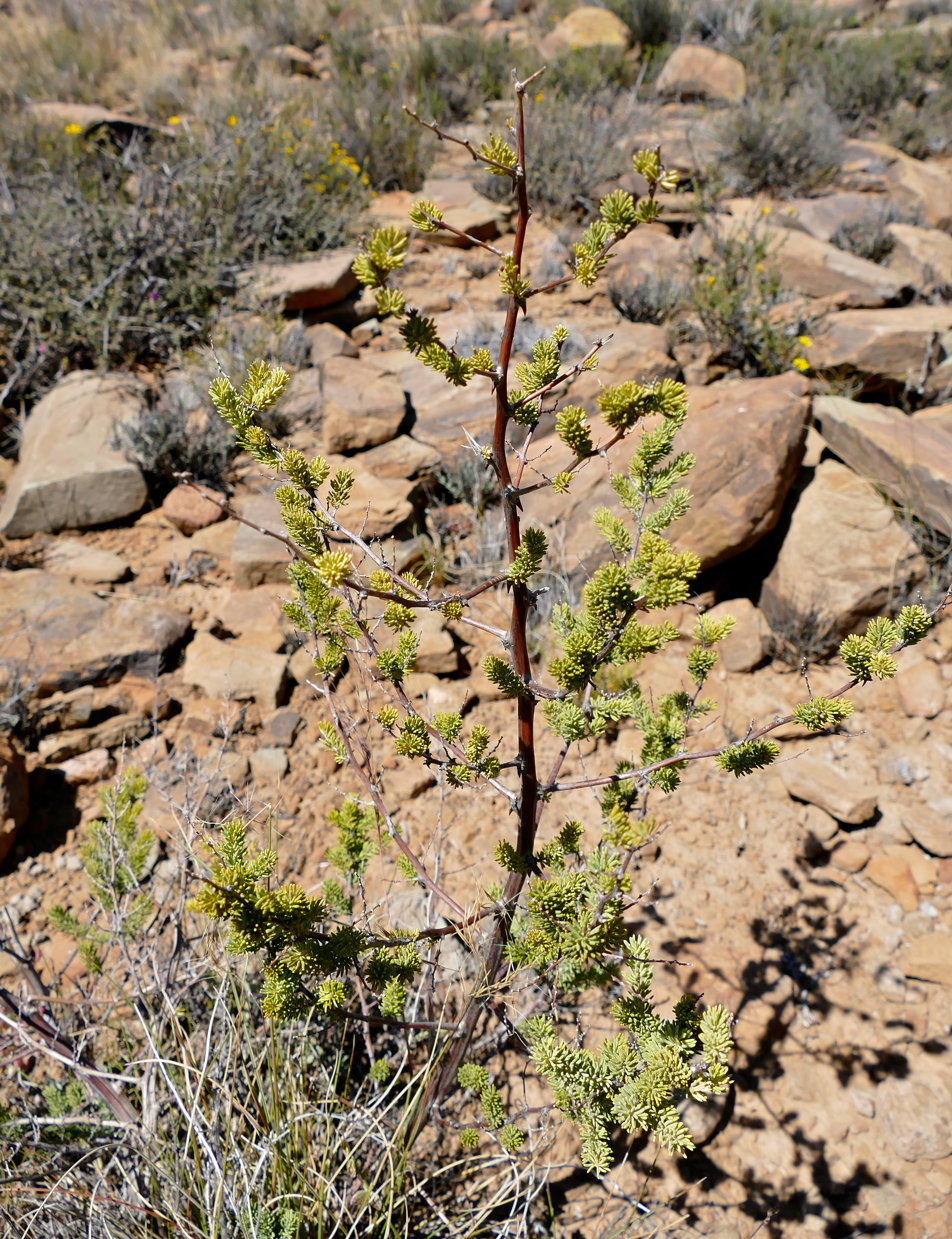

Scientific classification
- Kingdom: Plantae
- Clade: Tracheophytes
- Clade: Angiosperms
- Clade: Monocots
- Order: Asparagales
- Family: Asparagaceae
- Subfamily: Asparagoideae
- Genus: Asparagus
- Species: A. mucronatus

Binomial name
- Asparagus mucronatus Jessop

= Asparagus mucronatus =

Species of shrub

Asparagus mucronatus ("Katdoring") is a thorny shrub or creeper of the Asparagus genus, that is indigenous to the southern Cape regions of South Africa.

== Description ==
A shrub or climber (reaching max. 2 meters in height) with recurved 5mm thorns. The young stems are hairy, with long basal bracts (2–6 cm).

The 5mm leaves have sharp tips, and are in groups of four.

The white flowers appear in Summer, and have a very strong and pleasant fragrance.

== Distribution ==
This species is indigenous to the southern Cape regions of South Africa. Its distribution is from Paarl in the Western Cape Province, across the southern Cape into the Eastern Cape Province.

It occurs in rocky succulent karoo and renosterveld vegetation.
