= Strumaria perryae =

Scientific classification
- Kingdom: Plantae
- Clade: Tracheophytes
- Clade: Angiosperms
- Clade: Monocots
- Order: Asparagales
- Family: Amaryllidaceae
- Subfamily: Amaryllidoideae
- Genus: Strumaria
- Species: S. perryae

Binomial name
- Strumaria perryae Snijman

Synonyms
- Bokkeveldia perryae (Snijman) D.Müll.-Doblies & U.Müll.-Doblies

Species of flowering plant

Strumaria perryae is a perennial flowering plant and geophyte belonging to the genus Strumaria and is part of the renosterveld. The species is endemic to the Northern Cape and occurs on the Bokkeveldberge escarpment, north of Nieuwoudtville. The plant's habitat is changing due to agricultural activities.
