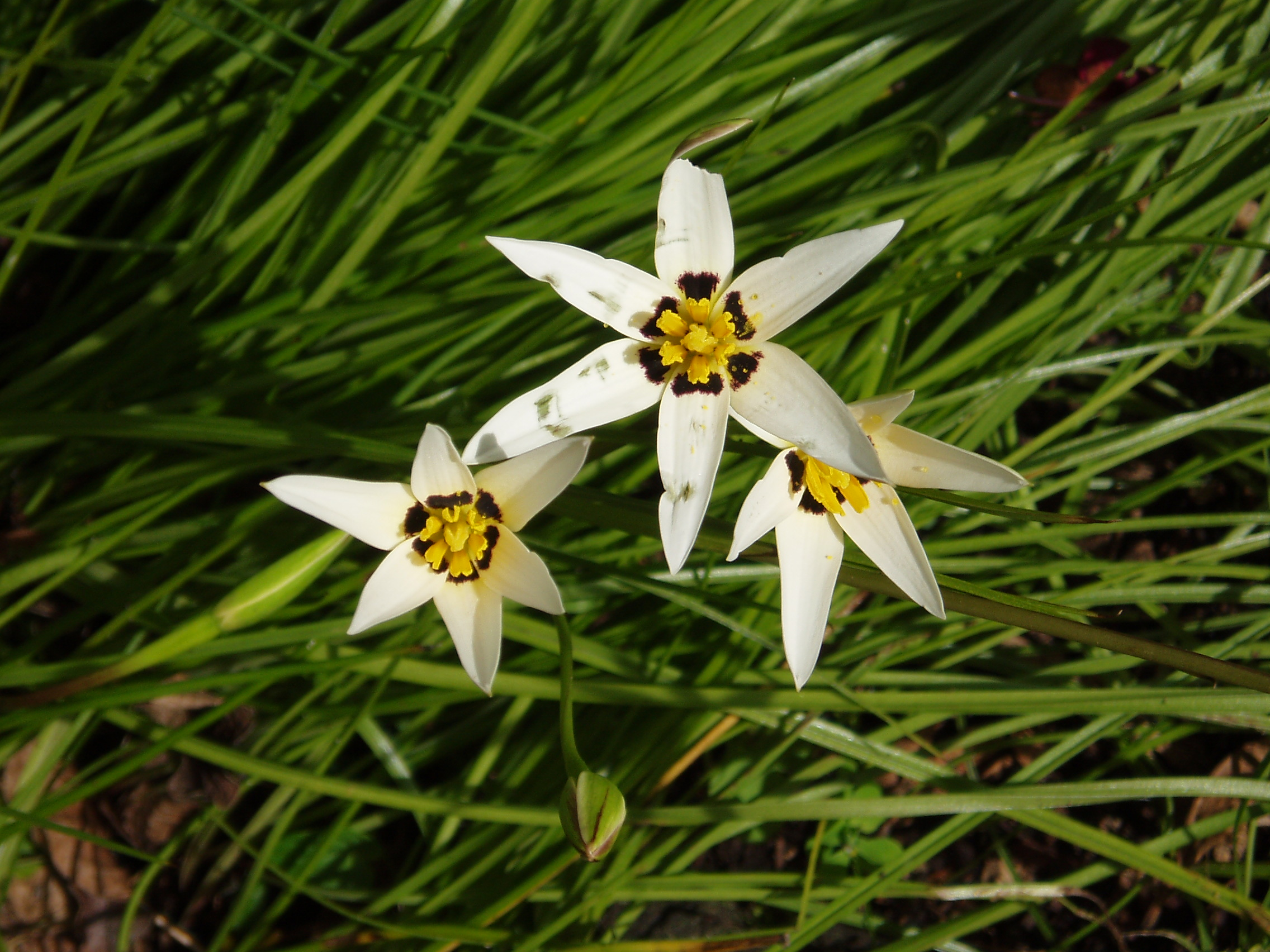
- Pauridia capensis

Scientific classification
- Kingdom: Plantae
- Clade: Tracheophytes
- Clade: Angiosperms
- Clade: Monocots
- Order: Asparagales
- Family: Hypoxidaceae
- Genus: Pauridia; Harv.

Species
- See text.

Synonyms
- Ianthe Salisb.; Janthe Nel; Saniella Hilliard & B.L.Burtt; Spiloxene Salisb.

= Pauridia =

Genus of flowering plants

Pauridia is a flowering plant genus in the family Hypoxidaceae. It is native to southern Africa (the Cape Provinces, KwaZulu-Natal, Lesotho and Namibia), and southern Australia (New South Wales, South Australia, Tasmania, Victoria, Western Australia). It has been introduced into New Zealand. The southern African species have been transferred from the genus Spiloxene.

== Species ==
As of November 2020, Plants of the World Online accepted the following species:

- Pauridia acida (Nel) Snijman & Kocyan
- Pauridia aemulans (Nel) Snijman & Kocyan
- Pauridia affinis (Schult. & Schult.f.) Snijman & Kocyan
- Pauridia alba (Thunb.) Snijman & Kocyan
- Pauridia alticola Snijman & Kocyan
- Pauridia aquatica (L.f.) Snijman & Kocyan
- Pauridia breviscapa Snijman
- Pauridia canaliculata (Garside) Snijman & Kocyan
- Pauridia capensis (L.) Snijman & Kocyan
- Pauridia curculigoides (Bolus) Snijman & Kocyan
- Pauridia etesionamibensis (U.Müll.-Doblies, Mark.Ackermann, Weigend & D.Müll.-Doblies) Snijman & Kocyan
- Pauridia flaccida (Nel) Snijman & Kocyan
- Pauridia gardneri (R.J.F.Hend.) Snijman & Kocyan
- Pauridia glabella (R.Br.) Snijman & Kocyan
- Pauridia gracilipes (Schltr.) Snijman & Kocyan
- Pauridia linearis (Andrews) Snijman & Kocyan
- Pauridia longituba M.F.Thomps.
- Pauridia maryae Snijman
- Pauridia maximiliani (Schltr.) Snijman & Kocyan
- Pauridia minuta (L.f.) T.Durand & Schinz
- Pauridia monophylla (Schltr. ex Baker) Snijman & Kocyan
- Pauridia monticola Snijman
- Pauridia nana (Snijman) Snijman & Kocyan
- Pauridia occidentalis (Benth.) Snijman & Kocyan
- Pauridia ovata (L.f.) Snijman & Kocyan
- Pauridia pudica Snijman
- Pauridia pusilla (Snijman) Snijman & Kocyan
- Pauridia pygmaea Snijman & Kocyan
- Pauridia salina (M.Lyons & Keighery) Snijman & Kocyan
- Pauridia scullyi (Baker) Snijman & Kocyan
- Pauridia serrata (Thunb.) Snijman & Kocyan
- Pauridia trifurcillata (Nel) Snijman & Kocyan
- Pauridia umbraticola (Schltr.) Snijman & Kocyan
- Pauridia vaginata (Schltdl.) Snijman & Kocyan
- Pauridia verna (Hilliard & B.L.Burtt) Snijman & Kocyan
