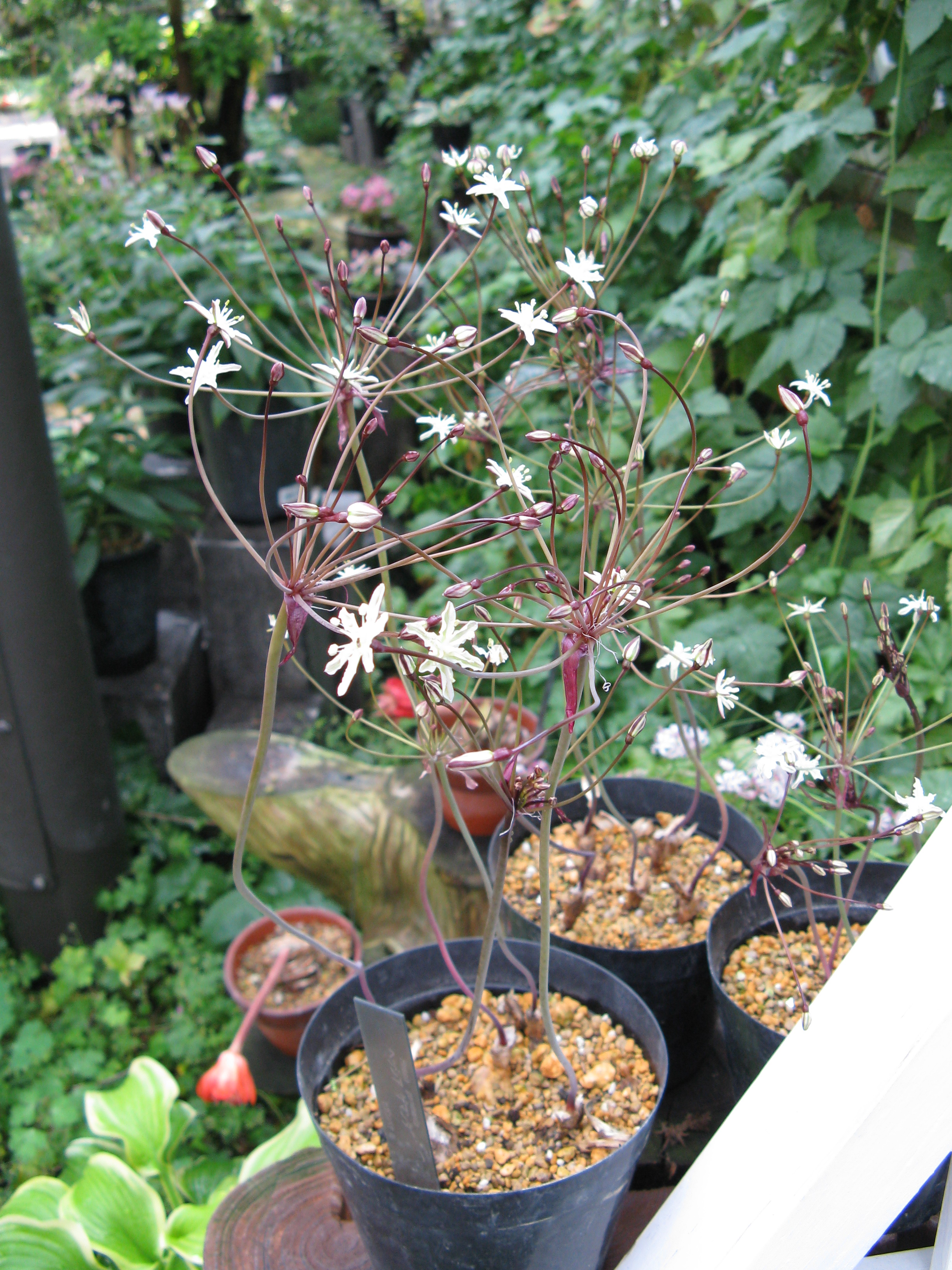
- Strumaria gemmata

Scientific classification
- Kingdom: Plantae
- Clade: Tracheophytes
- Clade: Angiosperms
- Clade: Monocots
- Order: Asparagales
- Family: Amaryllidaceae
- Subfamily: Amaryllidoideae
- Tribe: Amaryllideae
- Subtribe: Strumariinae; Traub ex D.Müll.-Doblies & U.Müll.-Doblies

Type genus
- Strumaria Jacq.

Genera
- See text

= Strumariinae =

Subtribe of flowering plants

Strumariinae is one of four subtribes within the tribe Amaryllideae (subfamily Amaryllidoideae, family Amaryllidaceae), found in southern Africa.

== Description ==
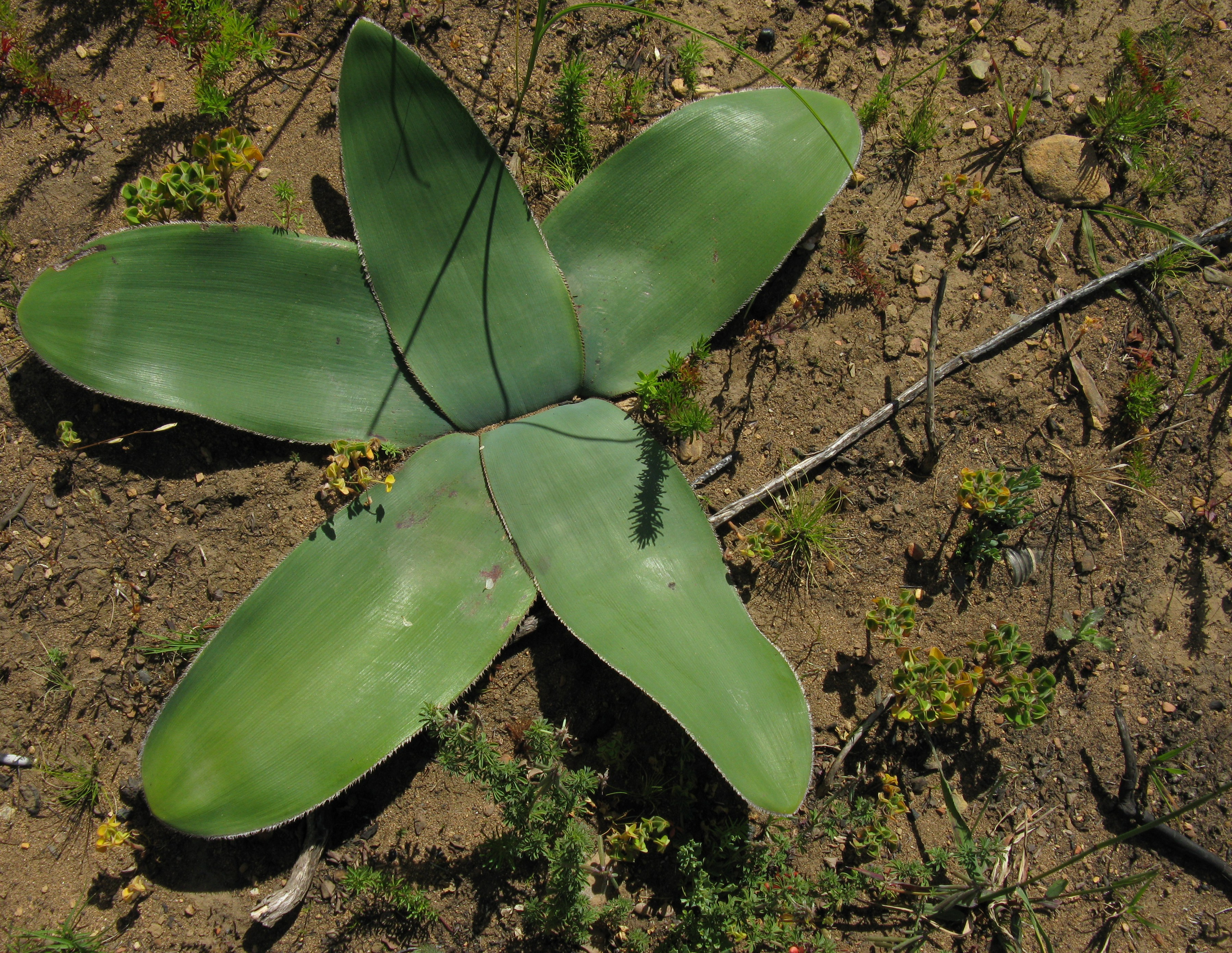
Crossyne guttata, showing prostrate leaves

The leaves are often prostrate (on the ground). The flowers may be zygomorphic or actinomorphic, and may or may not have a perigone tube. The stamens are connate (fused) into a tube at their proximal end. However Strumaria has one whorl of the stamens fused to the style. The fruit is dehiscent with seeds that have a well-developed integument that is chlorophyllous with a stomatose testa.

== Taxonomy ==
=== Phylogeny ===
Strumariinae are placed within Amaryllideae as follow:

These are phylogenetically related as follows:

- Tribe Amaryllideae
  - Subtribe Amaryllidinae
  - - Subtribe Boophoninae
    - - Subtribe Strumariinae
      - Subtribe Crininae

=== Subdivision ===
Strumariinae consists of six genera, related as follows, with number of species in each genus in (parentheses):

- Strumariinae
  - - - Nerine (~23)
      - - - - Brunsvigia (~23)
            - Namaquanula (2)
          - Hessea (13)
    - Strumaria (24)
  - Crossyne (2)

== Bibliography ==
- Müller-Doblies, U.; Müller-Doblies, D. (1996). "Tribes and subtribes and some species combinations in Amaryllidaceae J St Hil R Dahlgren & al. 1985". Feddes Repertorium. 107 (5–6): S.c.1–S.c.9.
- Meerow, Alan W.; Snijman, Deirdre A. (December 2001). "Phylogeny of Amaryllidaceae Tribe Amaryllideae Based on nrDNA ITS Sequences and Morphology". American Journal of Botany. 88 (12): 2321–2330. doi:10.2307/3558392. JSTOR 3558392. PMID 21669663.
- Snijman, D. A. and H. P. Linder. 1996. Phylogenetic relationships, seed characters, and dispersal system evolution in Amaryllideae (Amaryllidaceae). Annals of the Missouri Botanical Garden 83: 362-386
- Vigneron, Pascal (2008). "Amaryllidaceae". Amaryllidaceae.org (in French). Archived from the original on 4 January 2015.
- "Amaryllidaceae: A taxonomic tool for the Amaryllidaceae of the world". eMonocot. Archived from the original on 2016-03-04.
- Katja Weiehhardt-Kulessa, Thomas Bórner, Jiirgen Sehmitz, Ute Müller-Doblies, and Dietrich Müller-Doblies. 2000. Controversial taxonomy of Strumariinae (Amaryllidaceae) investigated by nuclear rDNA (ITS) sequences. 1. Hessea, Namaquanula, Kamiesbergia, and Dewinterella. Plant Syst. Evol. 223:1-13 (2000)
