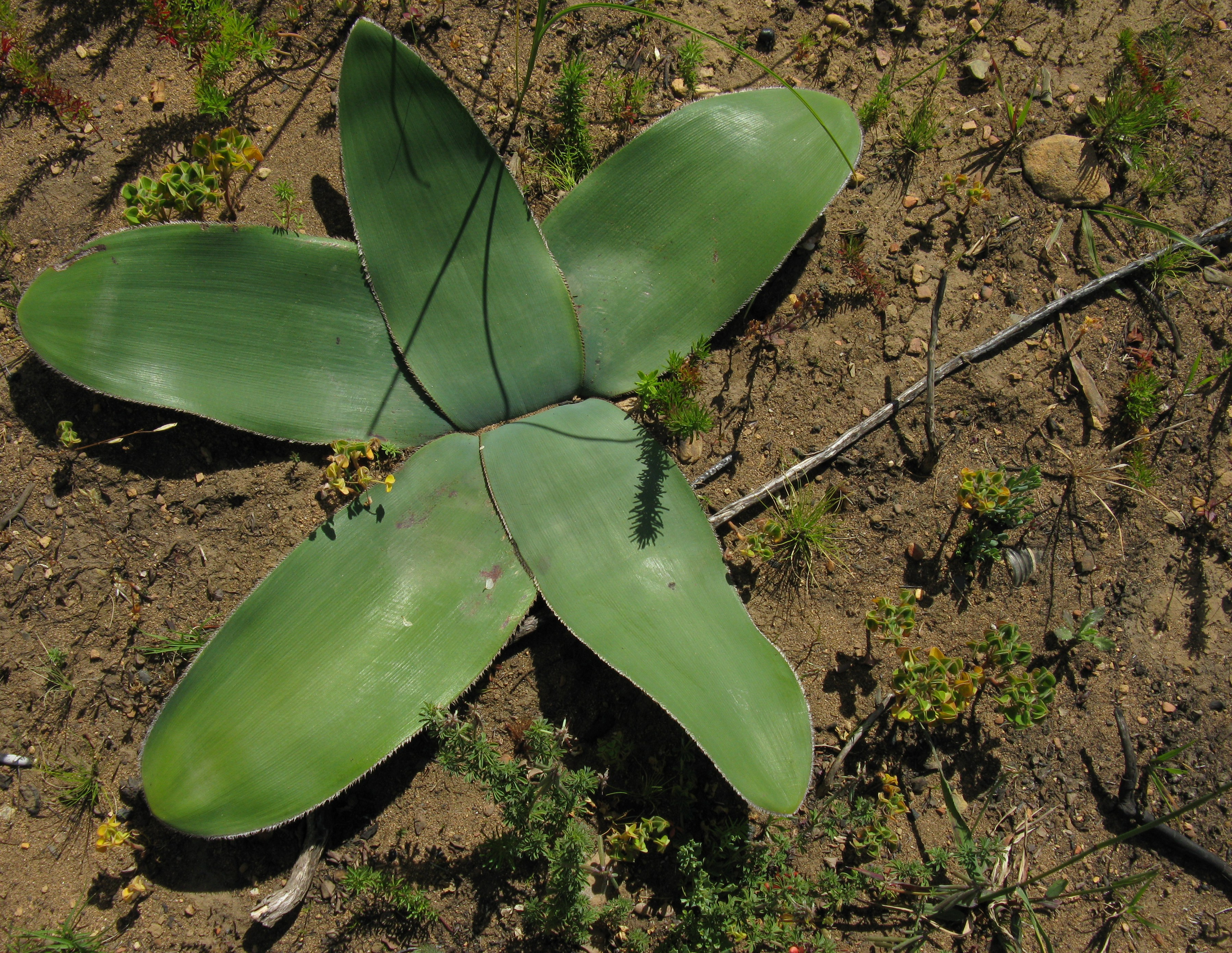
- Young mature Crossyne guttata in leaf

Scientific classification
- Kingdom: Plantae
- Clade: Embryophytes
- Clade: Tracheophytes
- Clade: Angiosperms
- Clade: Monocots
- Order: Asparagales
- Family: Amaryllidaceae
- Subfamily: Amaryllidoideae
- Tribe: Amaryllideae
- Subtribe: Strumariinae
- Genus: Crossyne; Salisb.

Type species
- Crossyne guttata (L.) D.Müll.-Doblies & U.Müll.-Doblies

= Crossyne =

Genus of flowering plants

Crossyne is a genus of South African flowering plants in the Amaryllis family.

== Taxonomy and features ==
There are two known species, both of which are native to the Cape Province in South Africa:

- Crossyne flava (W.F.Barker ex Snijman) D.Müll.-Doblies & U.Müll.
- Crossyne guttata (L.) D.Müll.-Doblies & U.Müll.-Doblies

After being included in the genus Boophone for many decades, Crossyne was raised to genus status in the 1990s, most conspicuously on the basis that:

- Crossyne leaves undergo the following characteristic metamorphosis, the seedling starting from paired, small, lorate leaves growing more or less erect among competing low vegetation. From the age of some four to six years however, the bulbs become large enough to produce broad, flat, prostrate leaves that compete well for space by growing over small neighbours. In this they differ from Boophone species, that grow more erectly, with distichous leaves.
- The leaf margins of Crossyne are completely fringed with straight short bristles, typically 1 cm or so in length, in one or more rows; Boophone leaves are completely glabrous.
- In both genera the bulb commonly grows to a mass of well over a kilogram, but the bulbs of Crossyne do not extend above ground at all unless because of erosion or similar factors, whereas Boophone bulbs tend to project perhaps halfway above the ground, depending on circumstances.

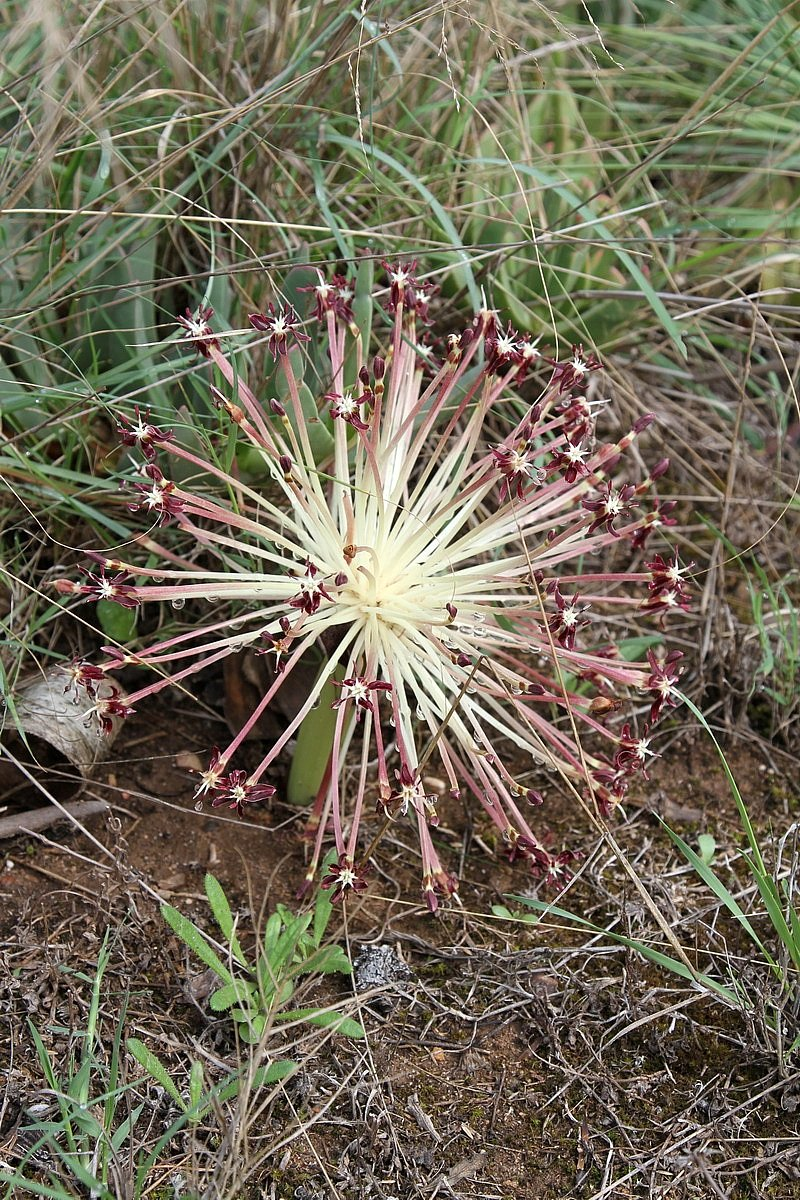
Inflorescence of Crossyne guttata

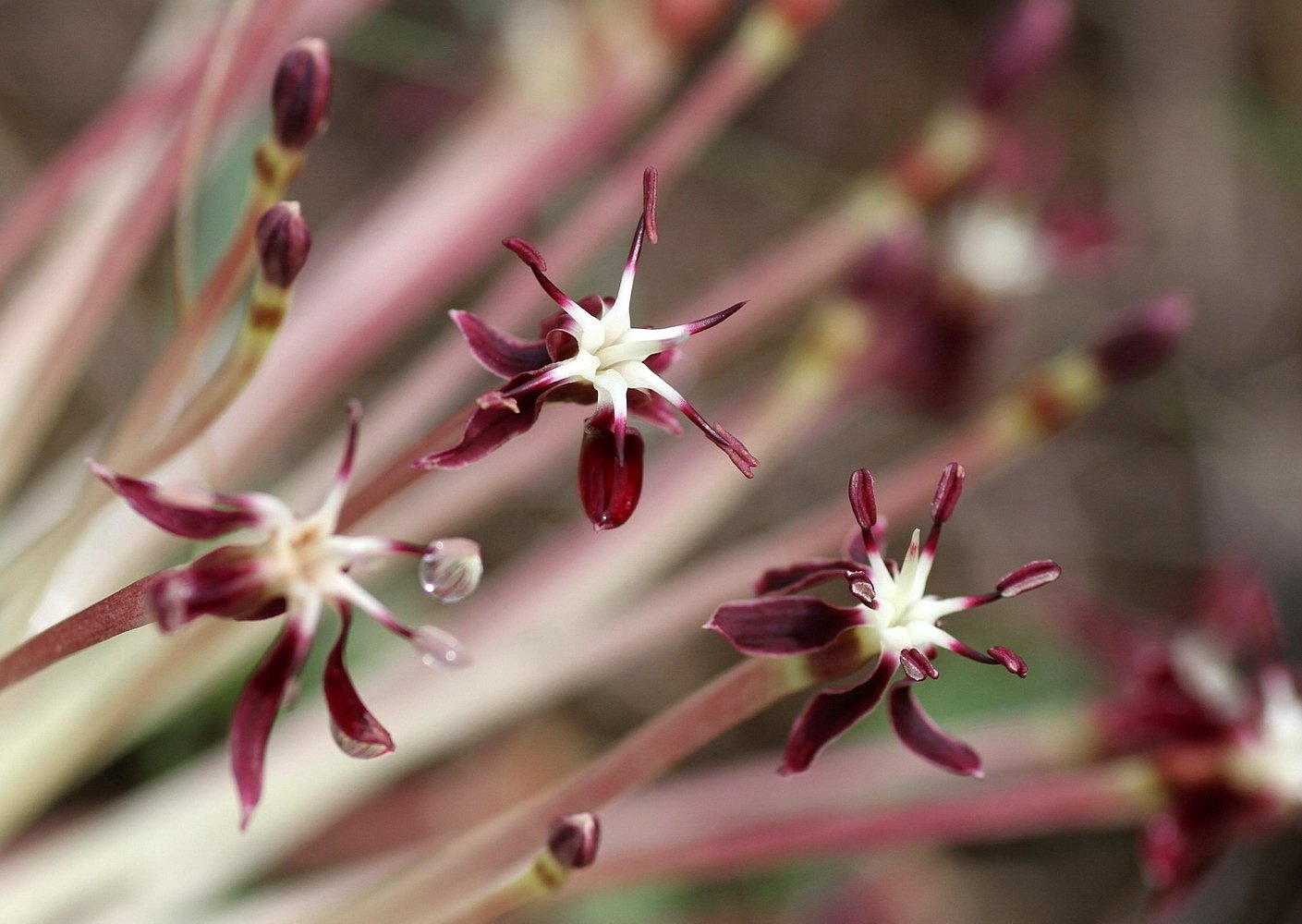
Flowers of Crossyne guttata

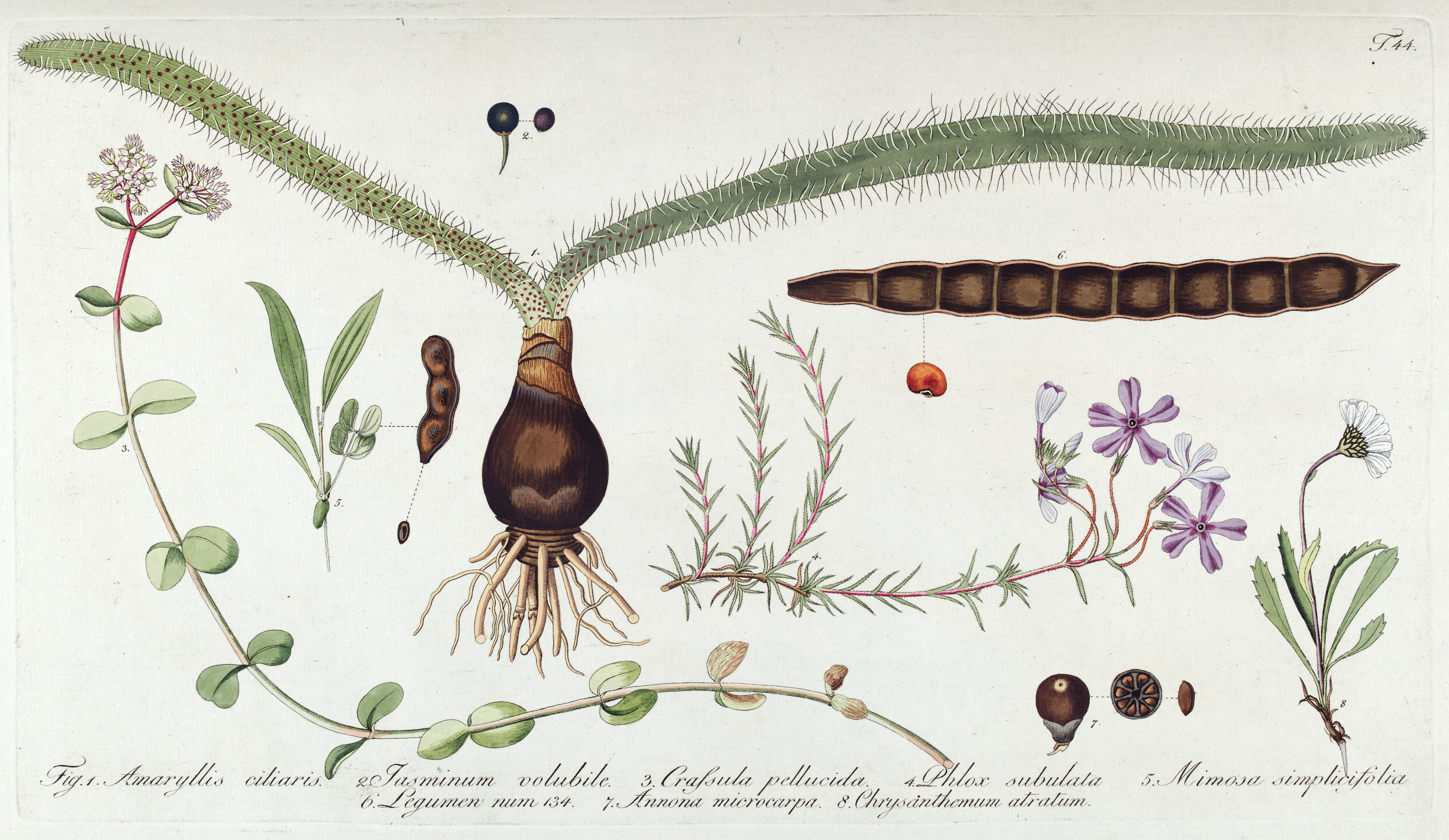
Lorate immature leaves of Crossyne guttata

== General biology ==
If not disturbed, which in the wild they seldom are, being dangerously poisonous, the bulbs grow for decades at least. As the bulb grows larger it produces more leaves, some six or eight in a season when mature. The leaves grow in a radial arrangement around the top of the bulb, emerging from a flat slit. The leaves are a decorative dark green, coriaceous in texture and mottled or spotted beneath, especially near the base. The margins of the leaves of all ages are elegantly ciliate, being fringed with eyelash-like bristles. The plant is strictly deciduous and endemic to a mainly winter-rainfall, partly semi-arid, region; the leaves emerging near the time of the first rains, about when the plant sheds the infructescence. The leaves dry out, curl up somewhat and detach towards late springtime or mid-summer, leaving little sign of the whereabouts of the dormant, buried bulb. If torn, whether alive or as yet undecayed, the leaves dried sap forms silky threads that in past times cattle herders used to apply to bleeding cuts as a styptic.
