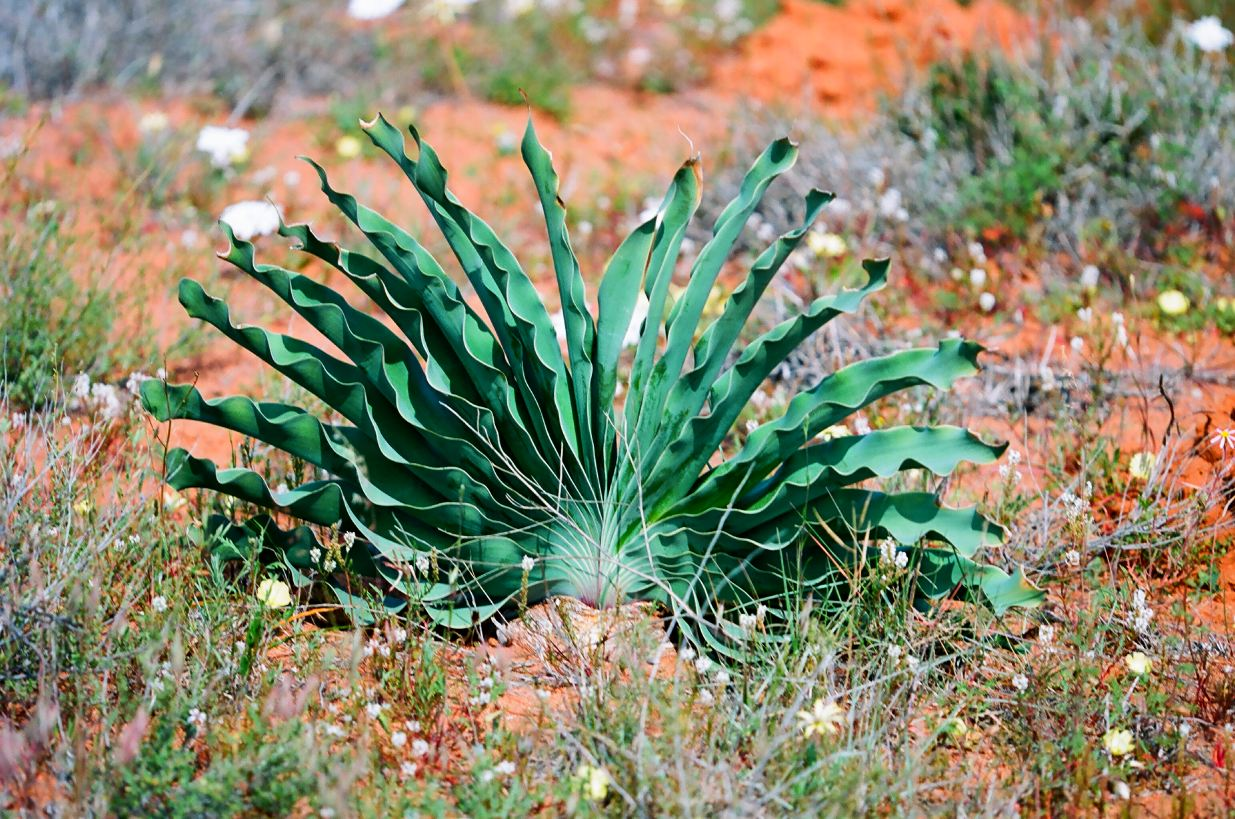

Scientific classification
- Kingdom: Plantae
- Clade: Tracheophytes
- Clade: Angiosperms
- Clade: Monocots
- Order: Asparagales
- Family: Amaryllidaceae
- Subfamily: Amaryllidoideae
- Genus: Boophone
- Species: B. haemanthoides

Binomial name
- Boophone haemanthoides F.M. Leighton

= Boophone haemanthoides =

Species of flowering plant

Boophone haemanthoides is a plant species native to Namibia and the Cape Provinces of South Africa. It is a bulb-forming herb with more than half of its scaly bulb appearing above ground. It produces a rather large umbel of pink flowers with narrow tepals.
