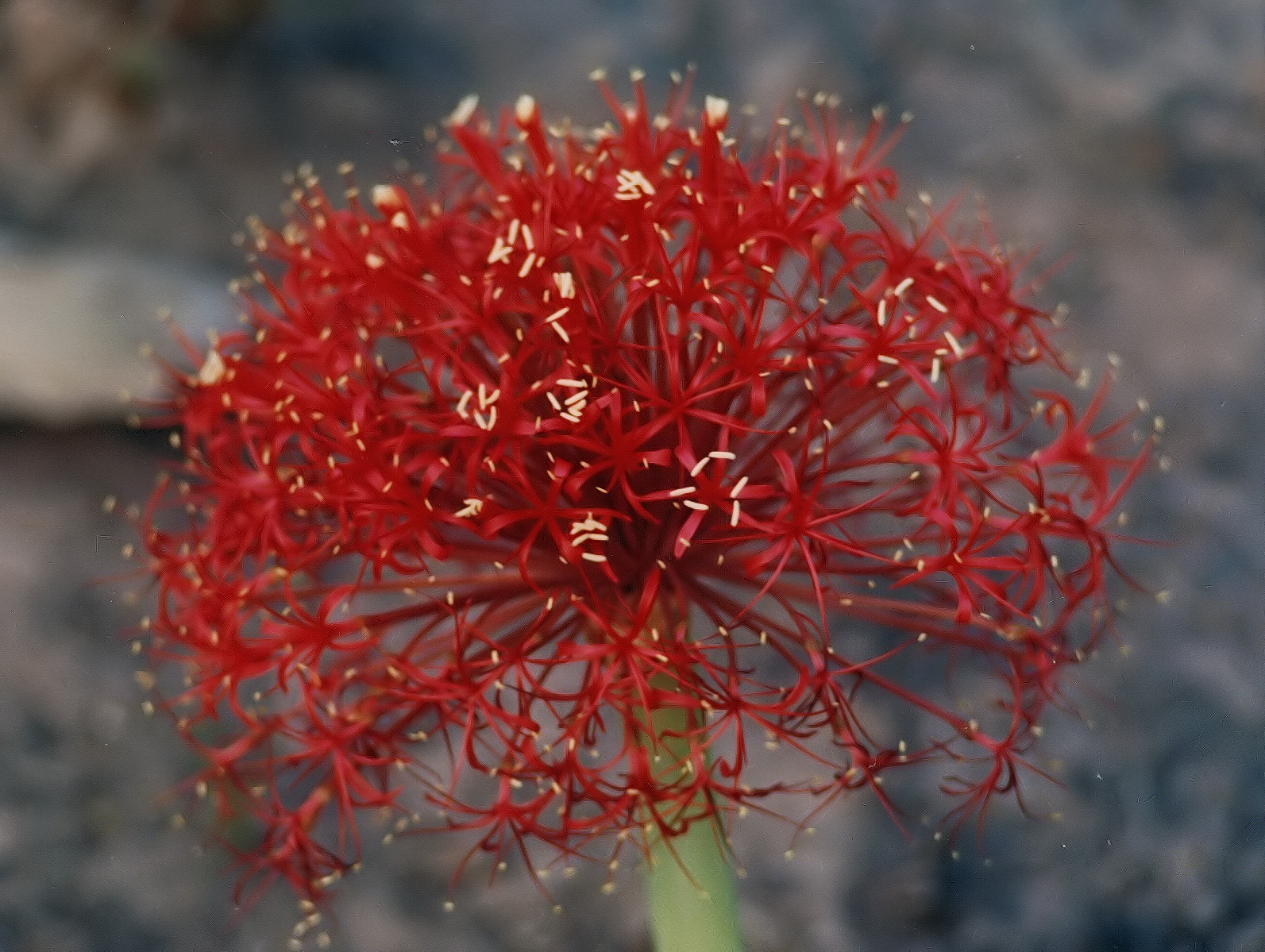
- Inflorescence of Boophone disticha

Scientific classification
- Kingdom: Plantae
- Clade: Tracheophytes
- Clade: Angiosperms
- Clade: Monocots
- Order: Asparagales
- Family: Amaryllidaceae
- Subfamily: Amaryllidoideae
- Tribe: Amaryllideae
- Subtribe: Boophoninae
- Genus: Boophone; Herb.

Species
- See text

Synonyms
- Buphane Herb.; Boophane Herb.

= Boophone =

Genus of plants

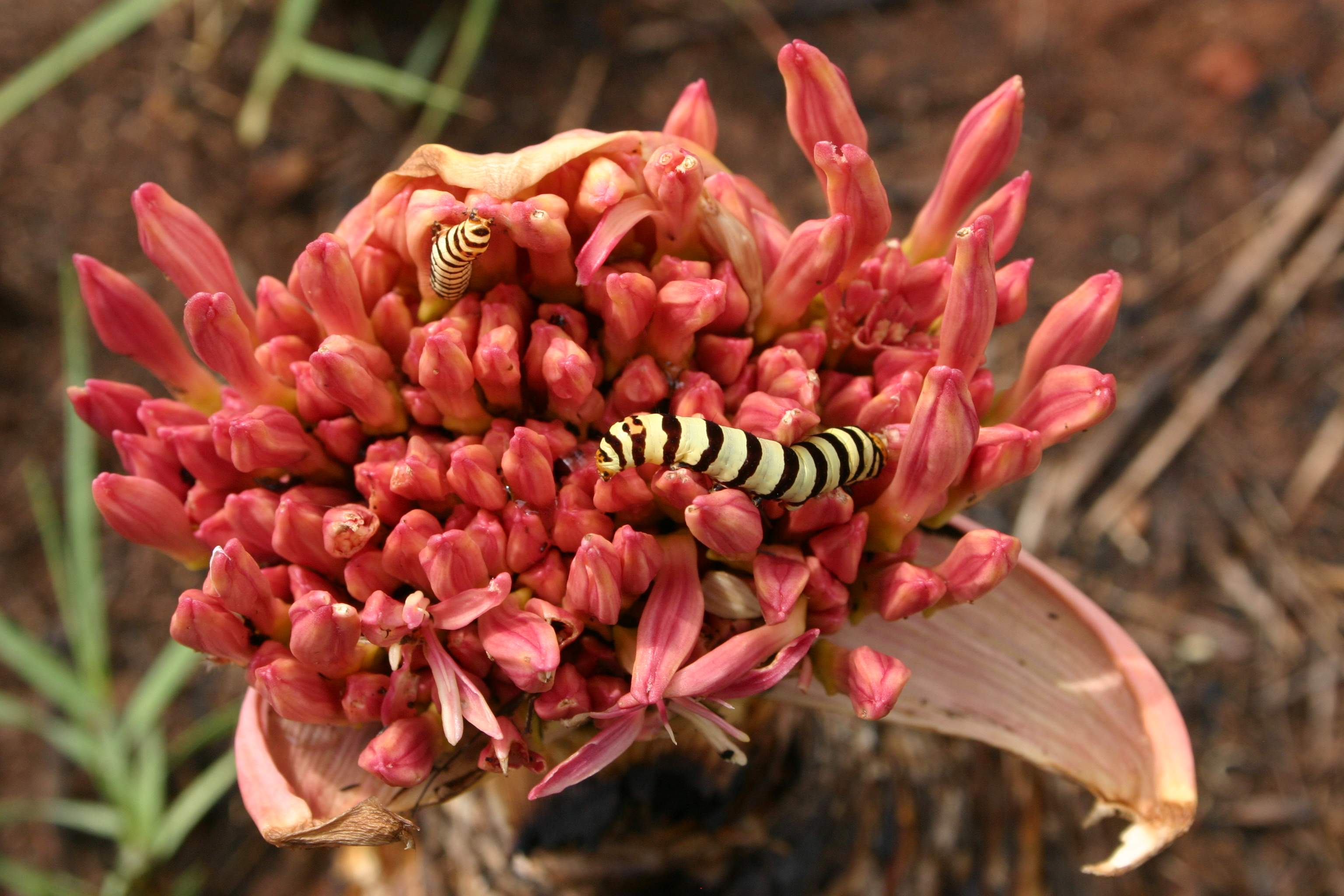
Boophone disticha flowerhead with caterpillars of the Noctuid moth Diaphone eumela

Boophone is a small genus of herbaceous, perennial and bulbous plants in the Amaryllis family (Amaryllidaceae, subfamily Amaryllidoideae.) It consists of two confirmed species distributed across South Africa to Kenya and Uganda. It is closely related to Crossyne, a genus whose species have prostrate leaves. They are drought tolerant but not cold-hardy, and are very poisonous to livestock.

== Taxonomy ==
Boophone is the single genus in subtribe Boophoninae, in the Amaryllideae tribe.

=== Phylogeny ===
Boophoninae are placed within Amaryllideae as follows, based on their phylogenetic relationship:

- Tribe Amaryllideae
  - Subtribe Amaryllidinae
  - - Subtribe Boophoninae
    - - Subtribe Strumariinae
      - Subtribe Crininae

=== Species ===
The list of Boophone species, with their complete scientific name, authority, and geographic distribution is given below.

Flowers	Plant	Scientific name	Distribution
		Boophone disticha (L.f.) Herb.	From Sudan to South Africa
		Boophone haemanthoides Leight.	From Namibia to the Western Cape Province

=== Etymology ===
William Herbert wrote the name of this genus with three different orthographies: "Boophane" in 1821; "Buphane" and "Buphone" in 1825. This final spelling was corrected to "Boophone" in 1839 by Milne-Redhead. The name was derived from the Greek bous (an ox) and phone (death), due to its toxic nature to cattle. A proposal was published in 2001 to conserve the name "Boophone" and to take the earlier ones as synonyms. This proposal was accepted in 2002.

== Associated insects ==
Larvae of the moth genera Brithys and Diaphone use Boophone as a food plant.

== Traditional medicine ==
Boophone disticha is used in South African traditional medicine by the Zulu people to induce hallucinations for divinatory purposes, and also for various mental illnesses. Its use, however, is limited by injuries that result from the plant's toxicity. They have also been used as ingredients in traditional arrow poisons, and medicinal dressings for skin lesions.

== Chemistry ==
A variety of alkaloids with affinity for the serotonin transporter have been isolated from Boophone disticha.
