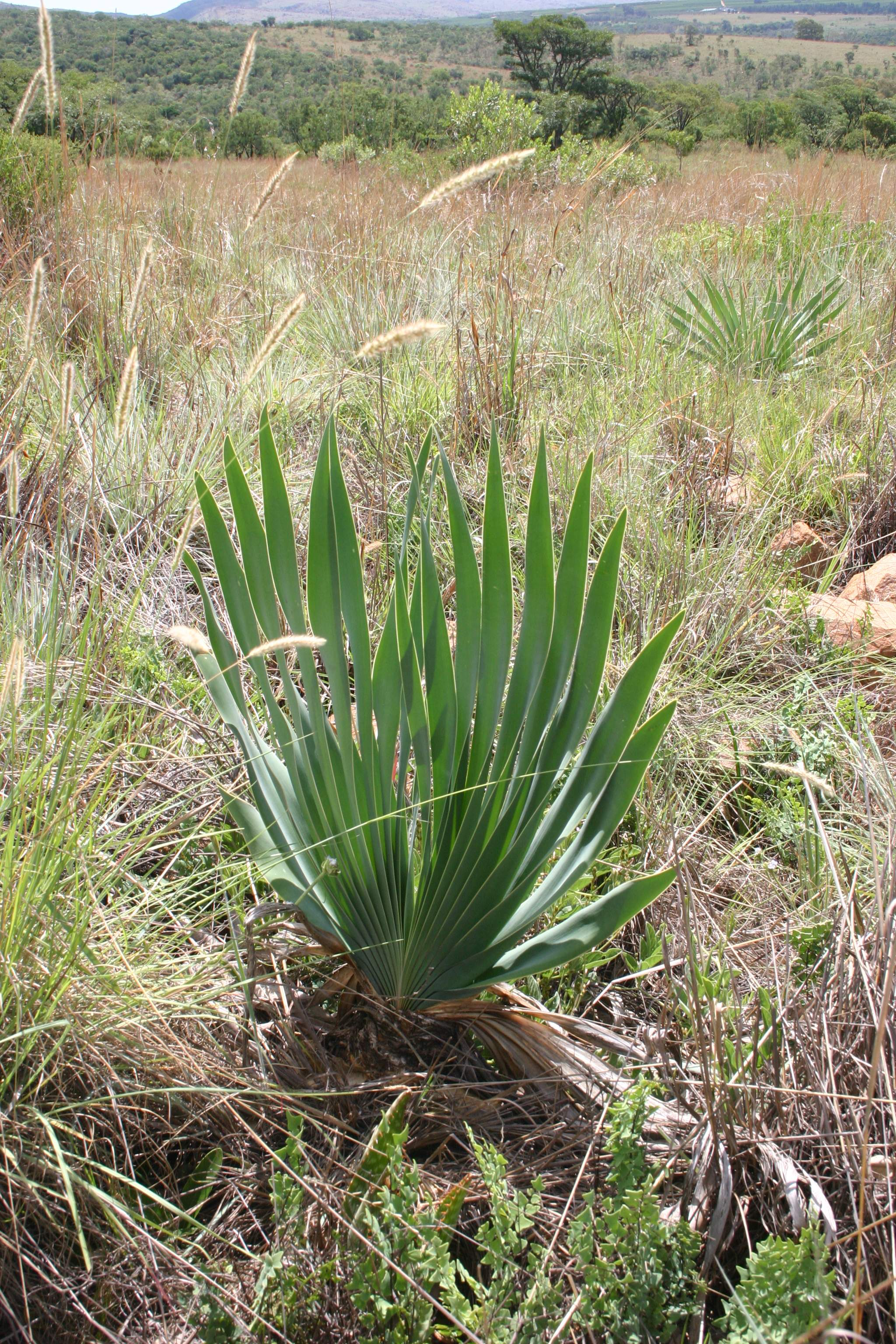
- Habitat
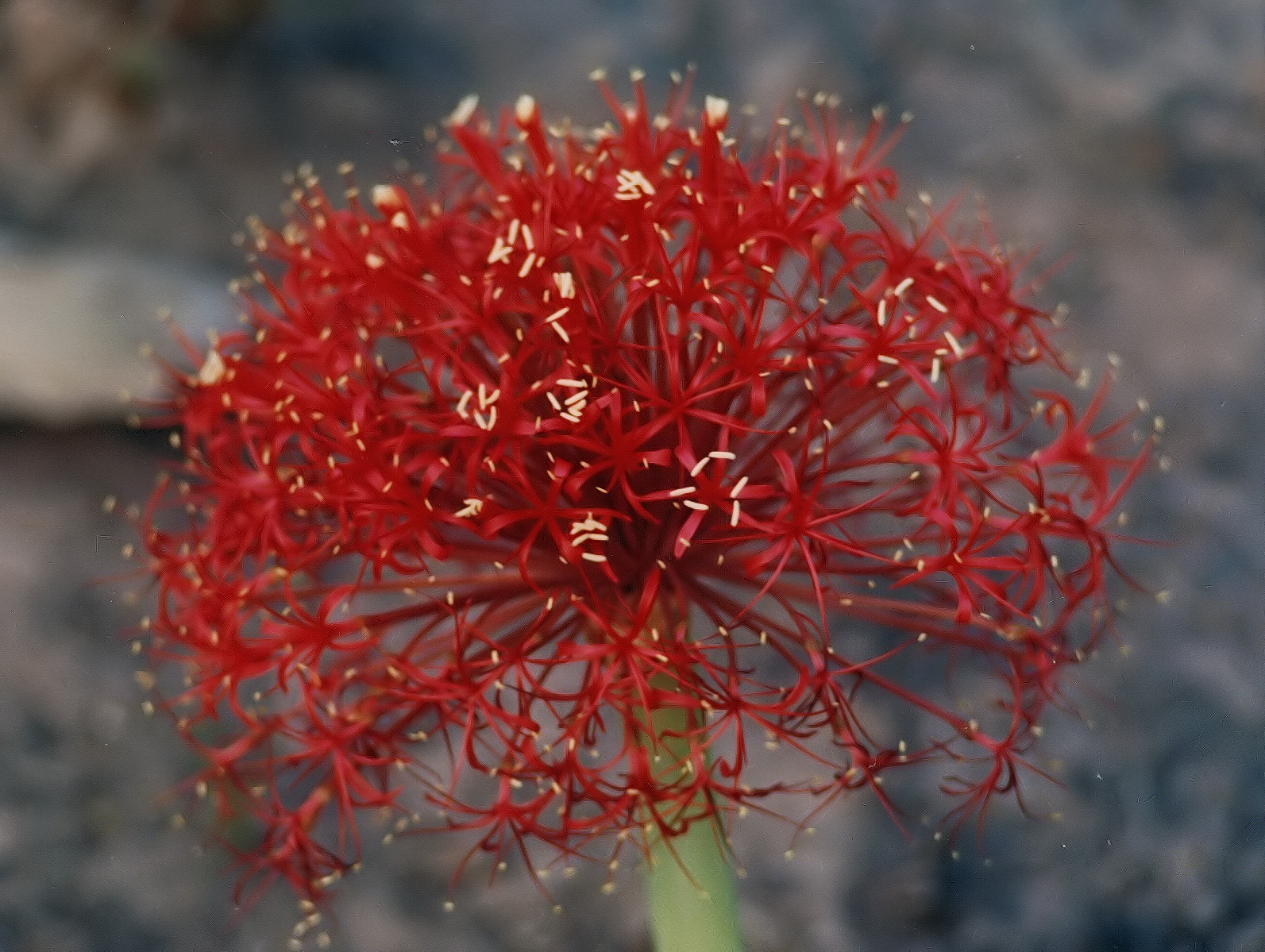
- Inflorescence

Scientific classification
- Kingdom: Plantae
- Clade: Tracheophytes
- Clade: Angiosperms
- Clade: Monocots
- Order: Asparagales
- Family: Amaryllidaceae
- Subfamily: Amaryllidoideae
- Genus: Boophone
- Species: B. disticha

Binomial name
- Boophone disticha (L.f.) Herb.

Synonyms
- List: Amaryllis disticha L.f.; Amaryllis toxicaria (L.f. ex Aiton) D.Dietr.; Boophone intermedia M.Roem.; Boophone longipedicellata Pax; Boophone toxicaria (L.f. ex Aiton) Herb.; Boophone toxicaria var. obtusifolia Herb.; Brunsvigia ciliaris (L.) Ker Gawl.; Brunsvigia disticha (L.f.) Sweet; Brunsvigia rautanenii Baker; Brunsvigia toxicaria (L.f. ex Aiton) Ker Gawl.; Haemanthus ciliaris L.; Haemanthus distichus (L.f.) L.f. ex Savage; Haemanthus lemairei De Wild.; Haemanthus robustus Pax; Haemanthus sinuatus Schult. & Schult.f., nom. nud.; Haemanthus toxicarius L.f. ex Aiton, nom. superfl.

= Boophone disticha =

Species of flowering plant

Boophone disticha is a bulbous tropical and subtropical flowering plant, native to Africa. It is commonly called the century plant or tumbleweed. The bulb contains alkaloids with analgesic and hallucinogenic properties and has a wide range of uses in traditional African medicine, as well as being used to make an arrow poison.

== Description ==
Boophone disticha is readily identified by its fan-like appearance of two tightly packed rows of about fifteen leaves in each row, and its up to 30 cm (12 in) diameter bulb half-protruding from the ground. It produces a single inflorescence, an umbel of about fifty pink, six-petaled flowers, before the arrival of the season's new leaves. While maturing the fruiting head's pedicels undergo a stiffening process and remarkable elongation to some 30 cm (12 in). When the fruiting head separates at its junction with the stalk, it forms a tumbleweed, easily moved by light breezes, scattering seeds as it rolls.

== Taxonomy ==
Boophone disticha was first collected from South Africa by Swedish botanist Carl Peter Thunberg and described by Carl Linnaeus the Younger in 1782 as Amaryllis disticha. Since that time, it has been placed in the genera Brunsvigia and Haemanthus, finally coming to rest as Boophone. The genus name itself was spelled in three different ways (Boophone, Boophane and Buphane) by the author William Herbert, straining the procedures of the rules of nomenclature. The etymology of the genus is from the Greek bous = 'ox', and phontes = 'killer of', a clear warning that eating the plant can be fatal to livestock.

== Distribution and habitat ==
Boophone disticha is native from south Sudan to South Africa. It is found in Angola, Botswana, Burundi, the Democratic Republic of the Congo, Eswatini, Kenya, Lesotho, Malawi, Mozambique, Namibia, Rwanda, South Africa (in the provinces of Eastern Cape, Free State, Gauteng, KwaZulu-Natal, Limpopo, Mpumalanga, Western Cape), Tanzania, Uganda, Zambia, and Zimbabwe. It grows wild in dry savannas, grasslands, and glades in forests.

== Uses ==
The bulb of Boophone disticha has a wide range of uses in traditional African medicine. It contains alkaloids such as lycorine, undulatine, buphanisine, buphanamine, nerbowdine, crinine, crinamidine, distichamine, 3O-acetyl-nerbowdine, buphacetine and buphanidrine which have analgesic and hallucinogenic properties.

It has been used locally to make an arrow poison and in the treatment of equine piroplasmosis.

The Khoi, Bushmen and Bantu were aware of its poisonous nature and used parts of the plant medicinally and as an arrow poison. The principal compounds are eugenol – an aromatic, volatile oil smelling of cloves and having analgesic properties, and the toxic alkaloids buphandrin, crinamidine and buphanine, the latter having an effect akin to that of scopolamine and if taken in quantity may lead to agitation, stupor, strong hallucinations and (if over-ingested) coma or death.

Material from this species' bulb was associated with preservation of the Khoi Kouga mummy found in the Langkloof.

== Gallery ==
Plant

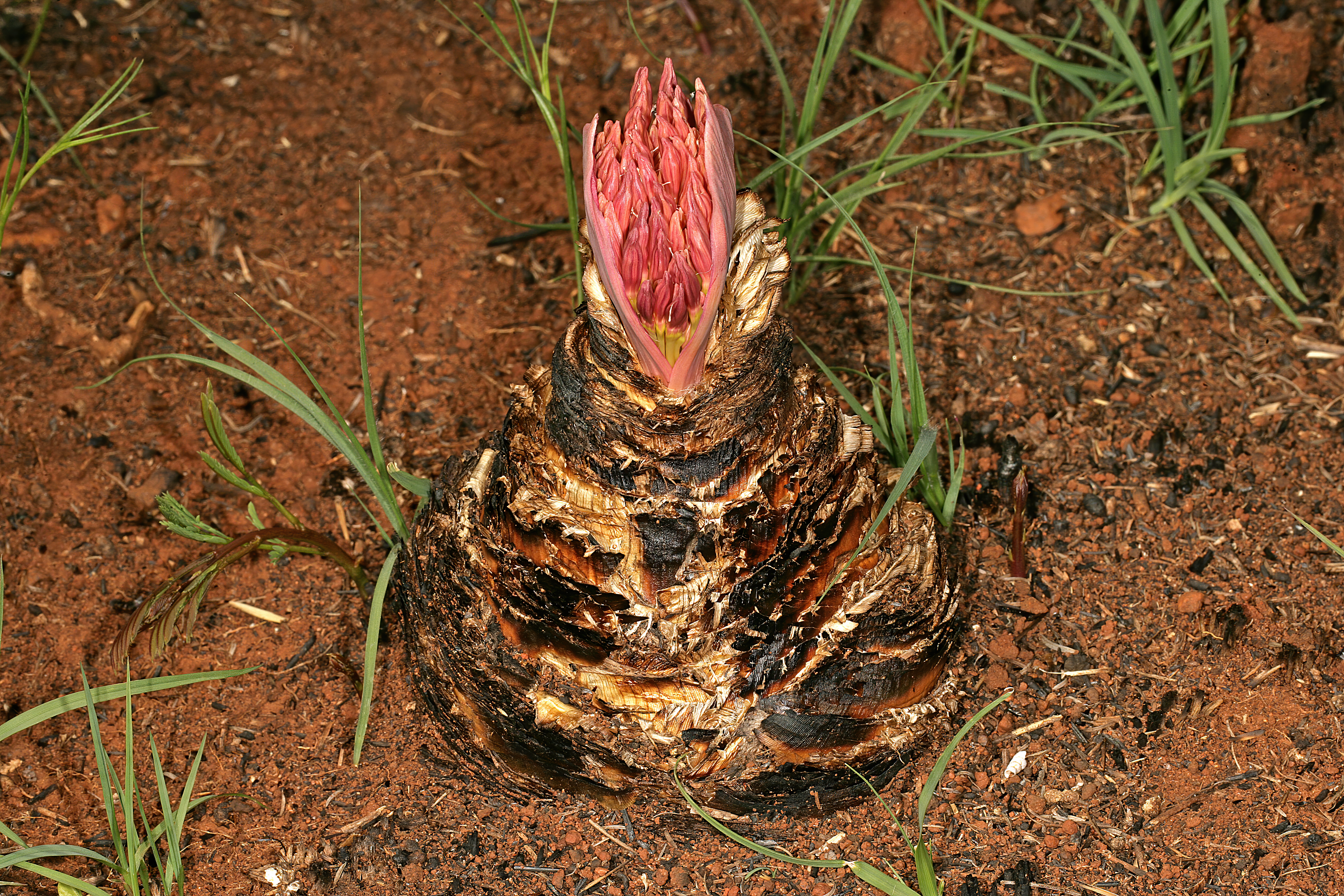
Edgeways view of young inflorescence emerging from bulb charred by bush fire

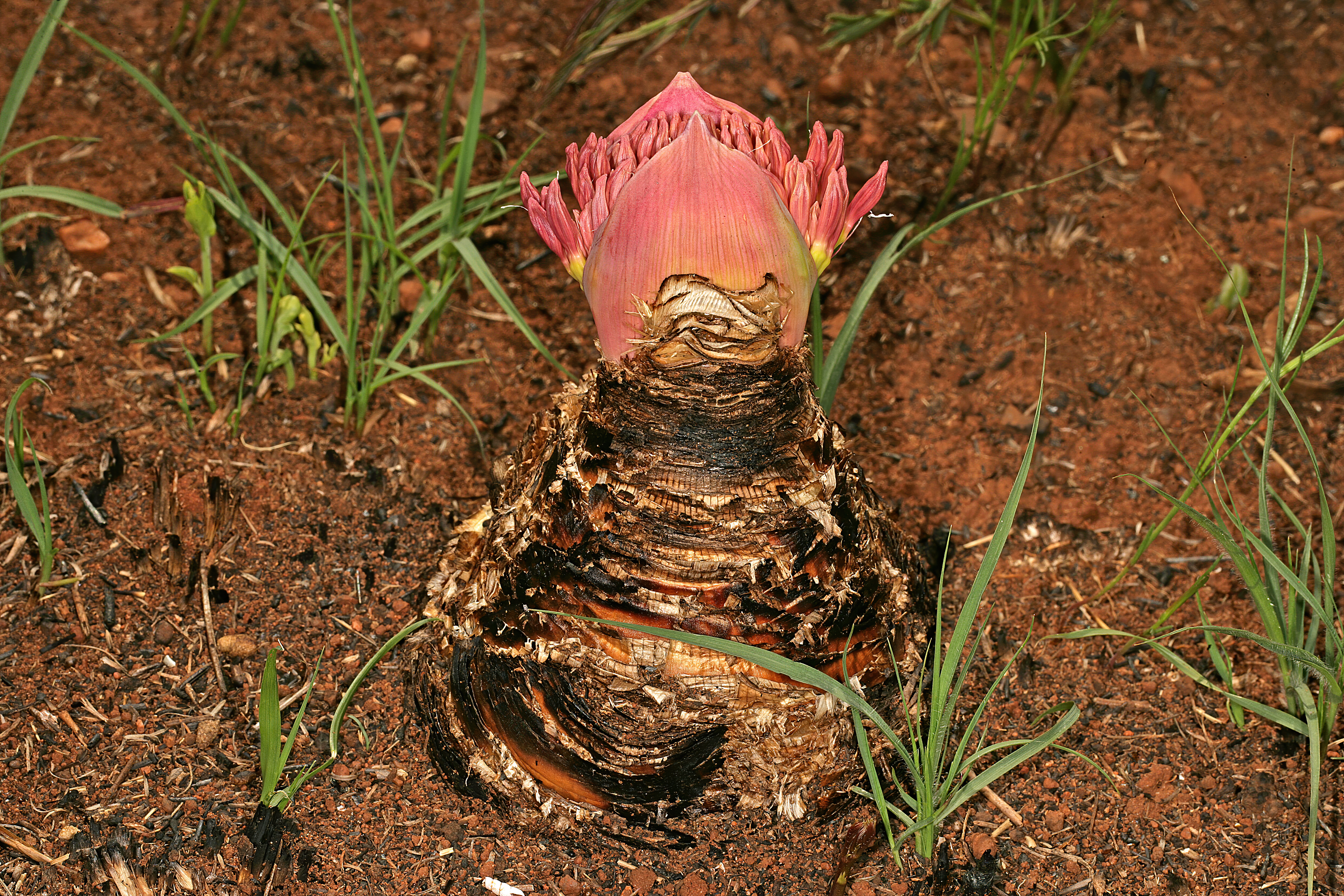
Same bulb, flatways, showing inflorescence sandwiched by broad bracts

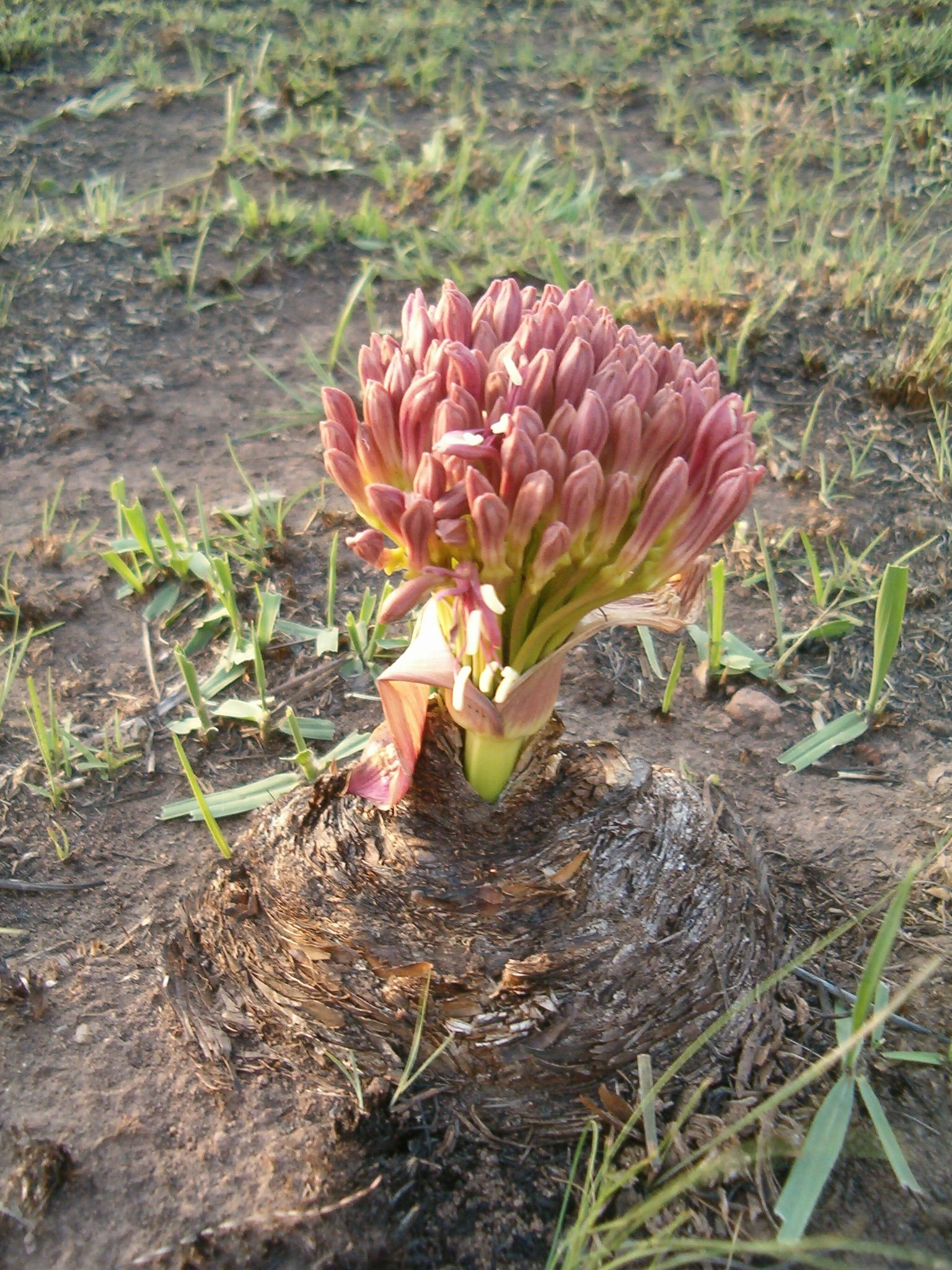
Buds of young inflorescence having emerged from enclosing bracts

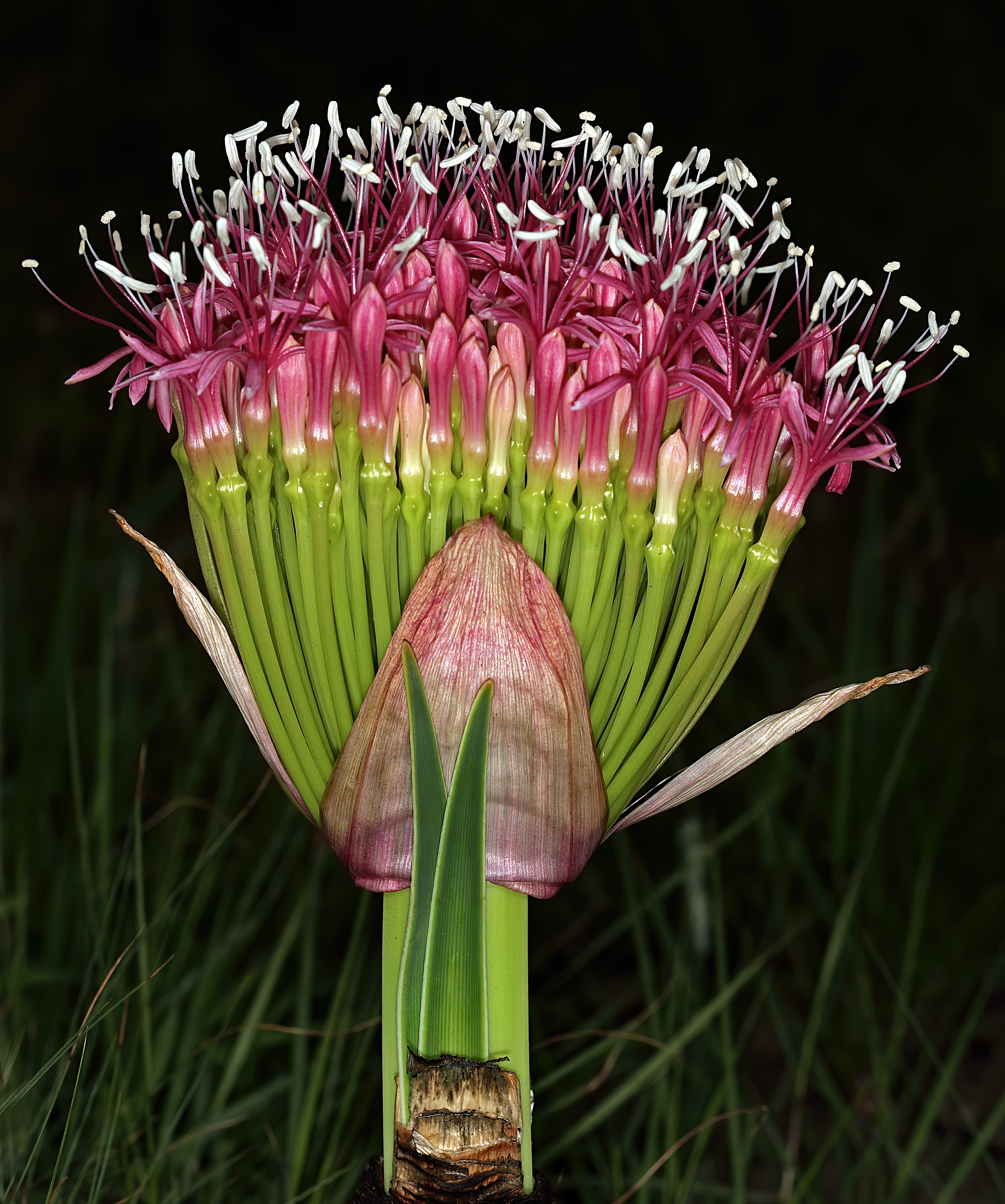
Mature inflorescence (flowers open), showing basal bracts and embryonic leaf fan

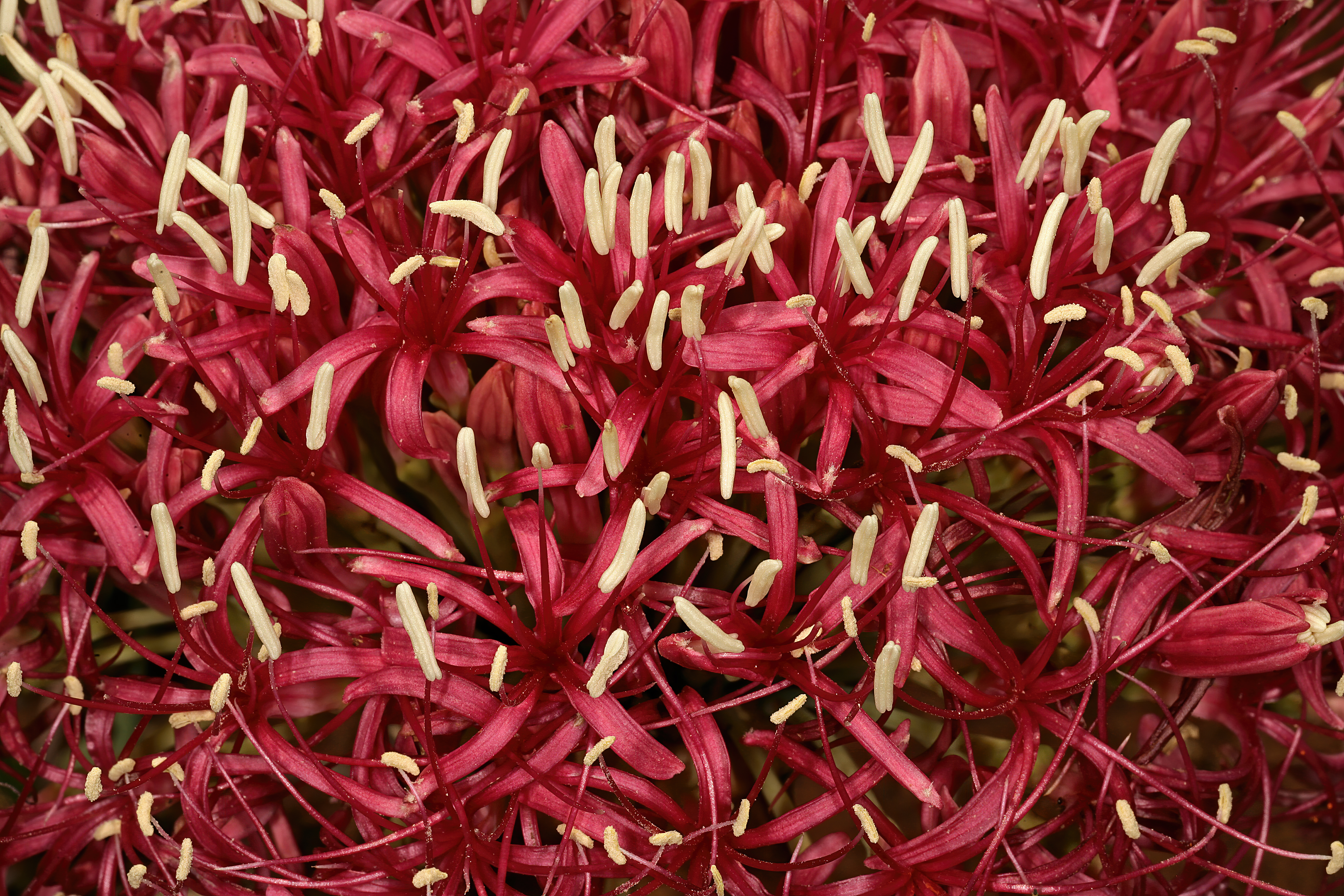
Densely-packed flowers: contrast of deep pink flowers and white anthers

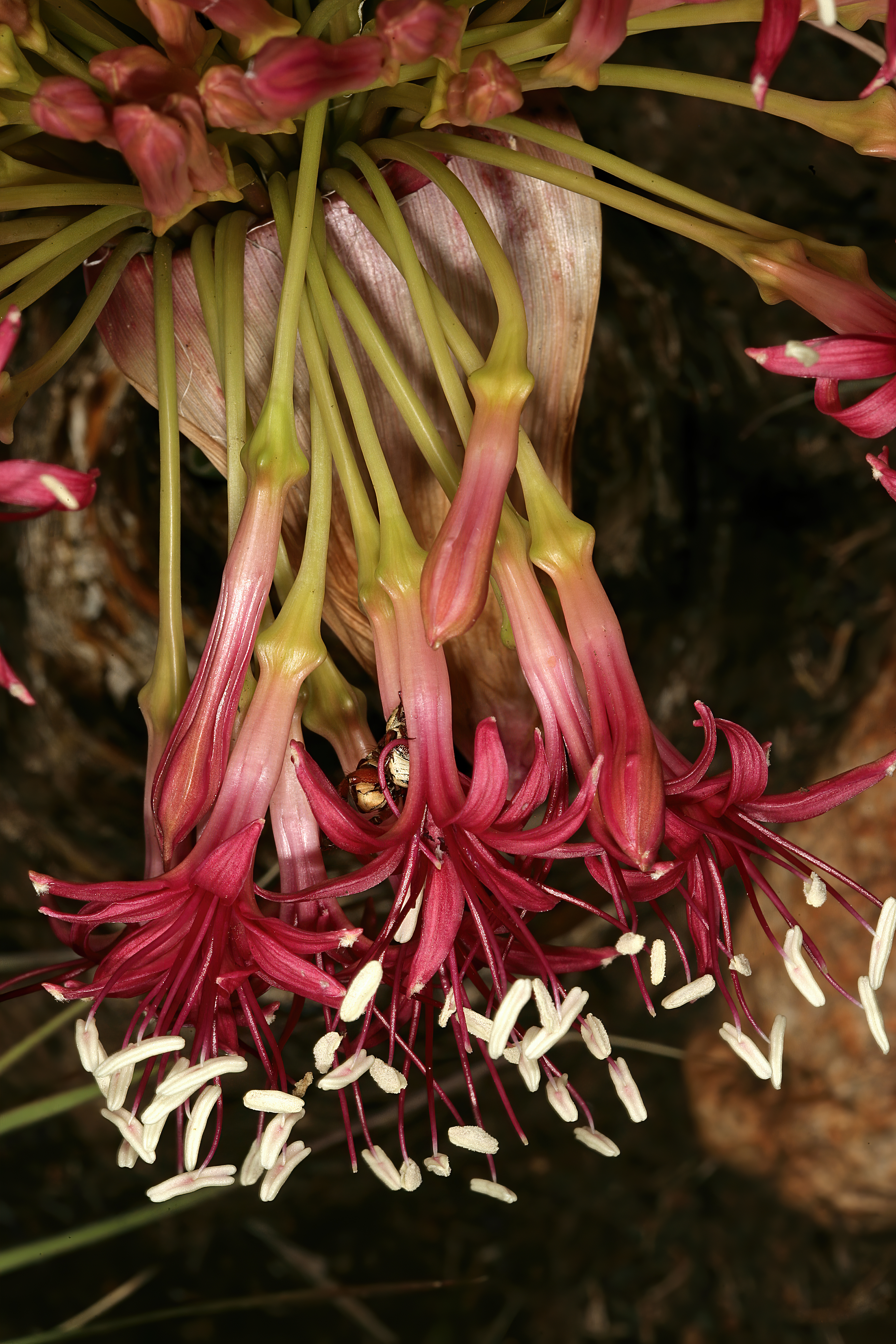
Flowers viewed in profile, showing trumpet shape and protruding stamens

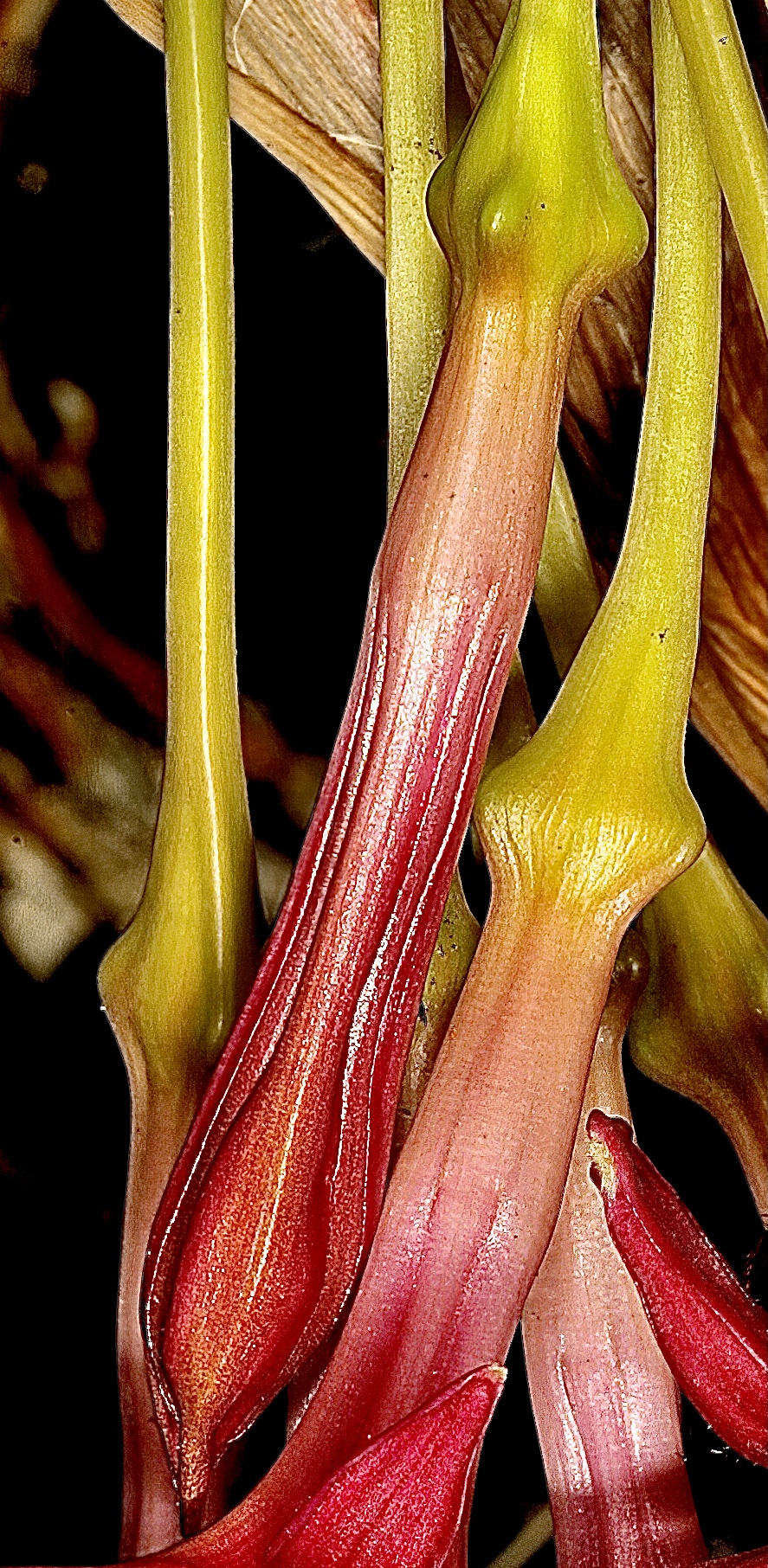
Single mature, closed flower bud

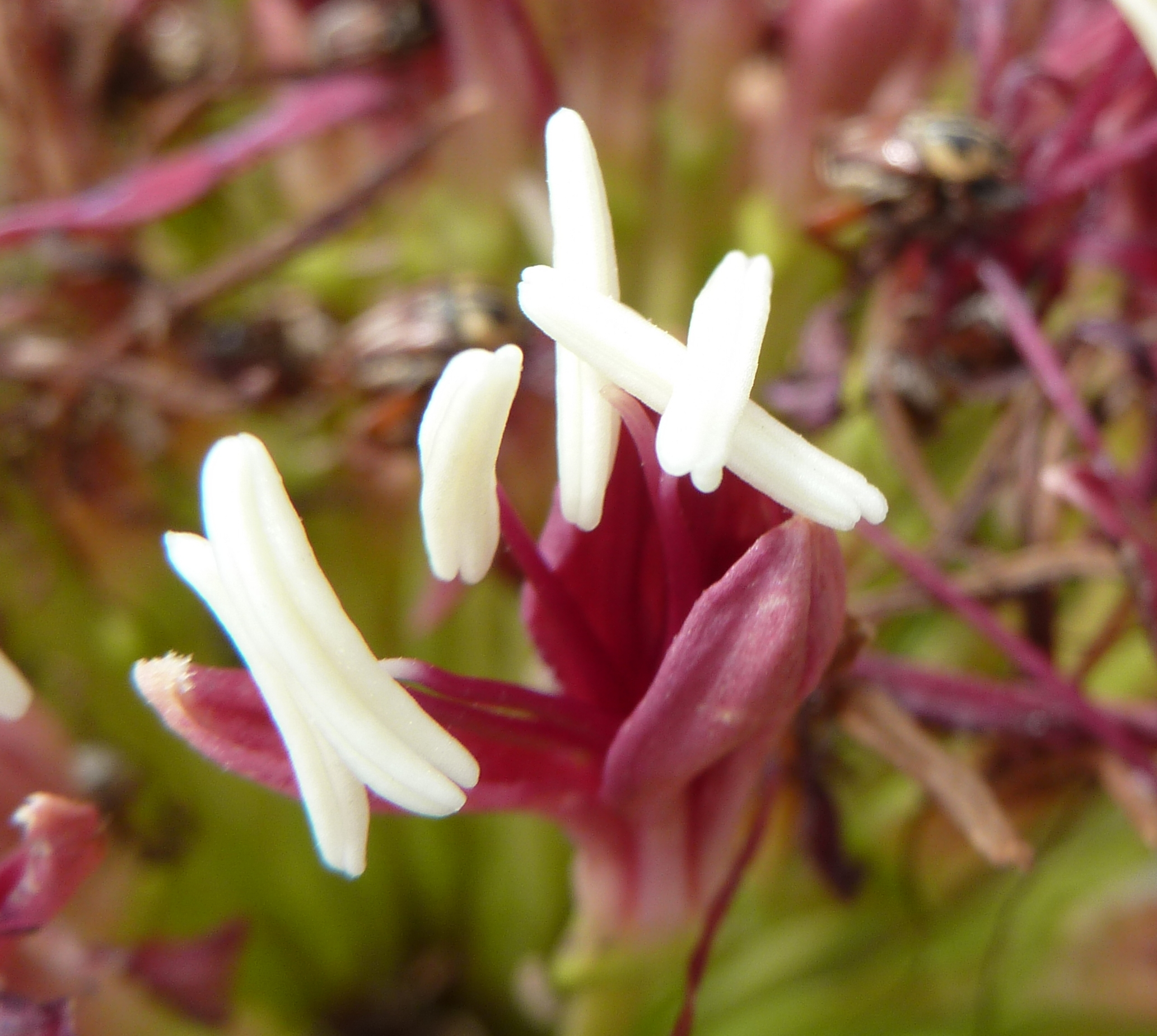
Single bursting flower bud revealing long white anthers

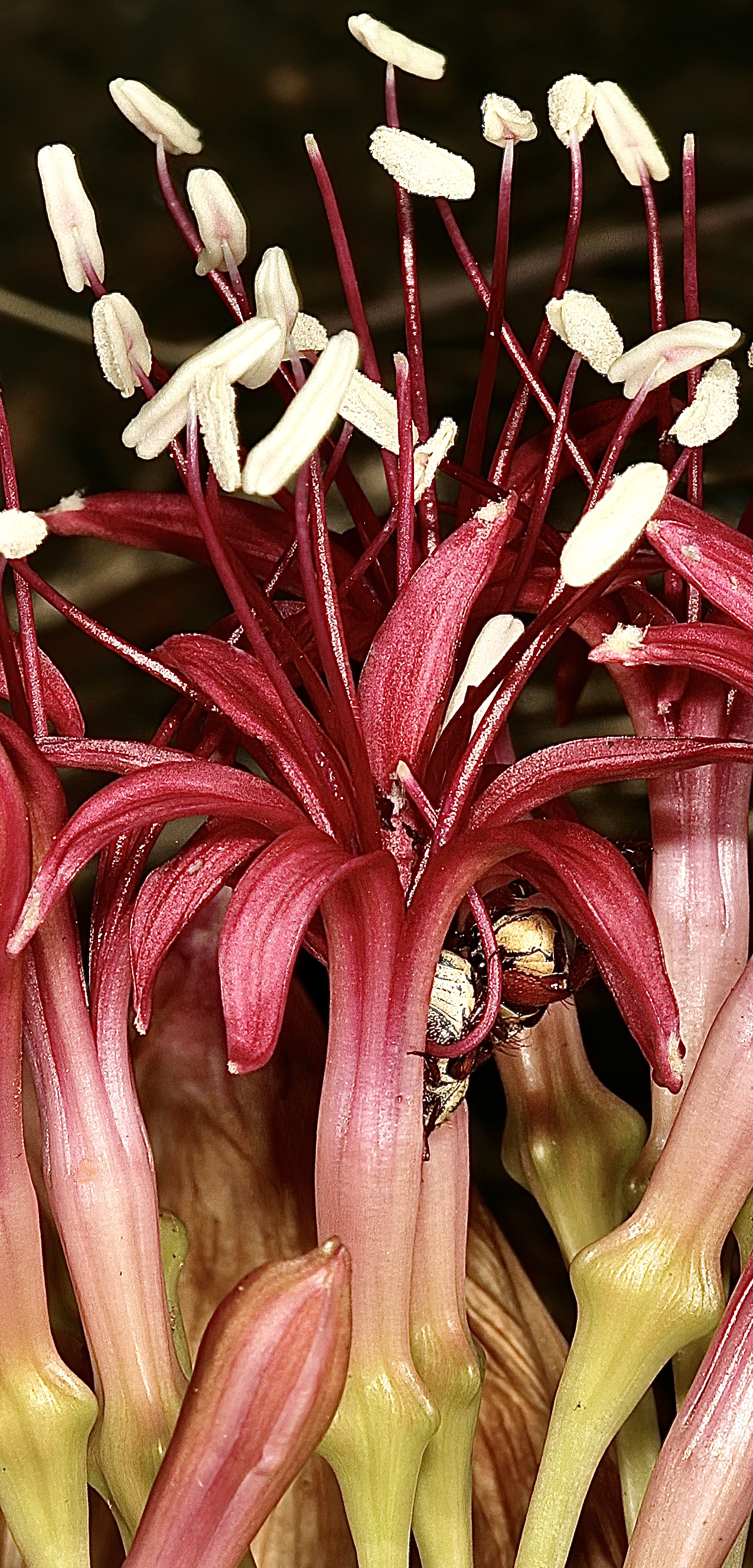
Single flower with half-concealed monkey beetles

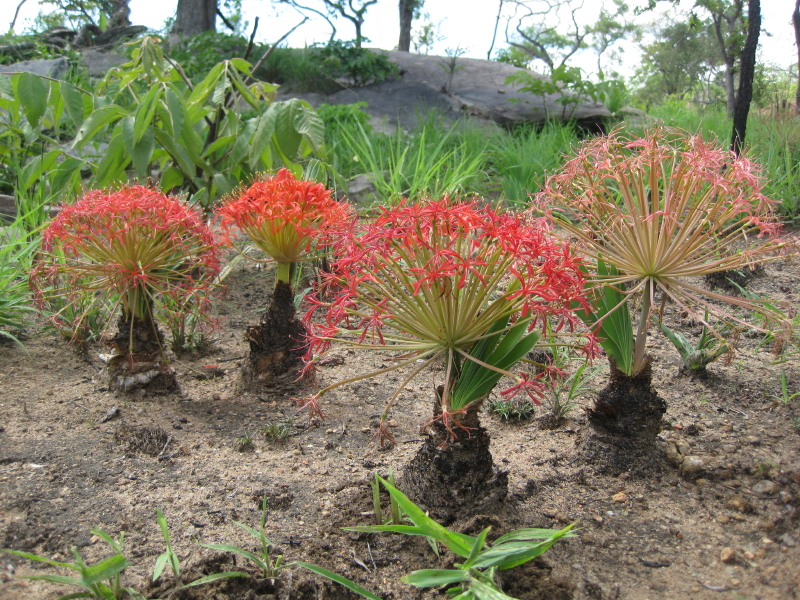
Small stand of bulbs - 3 in flower, one running to seed

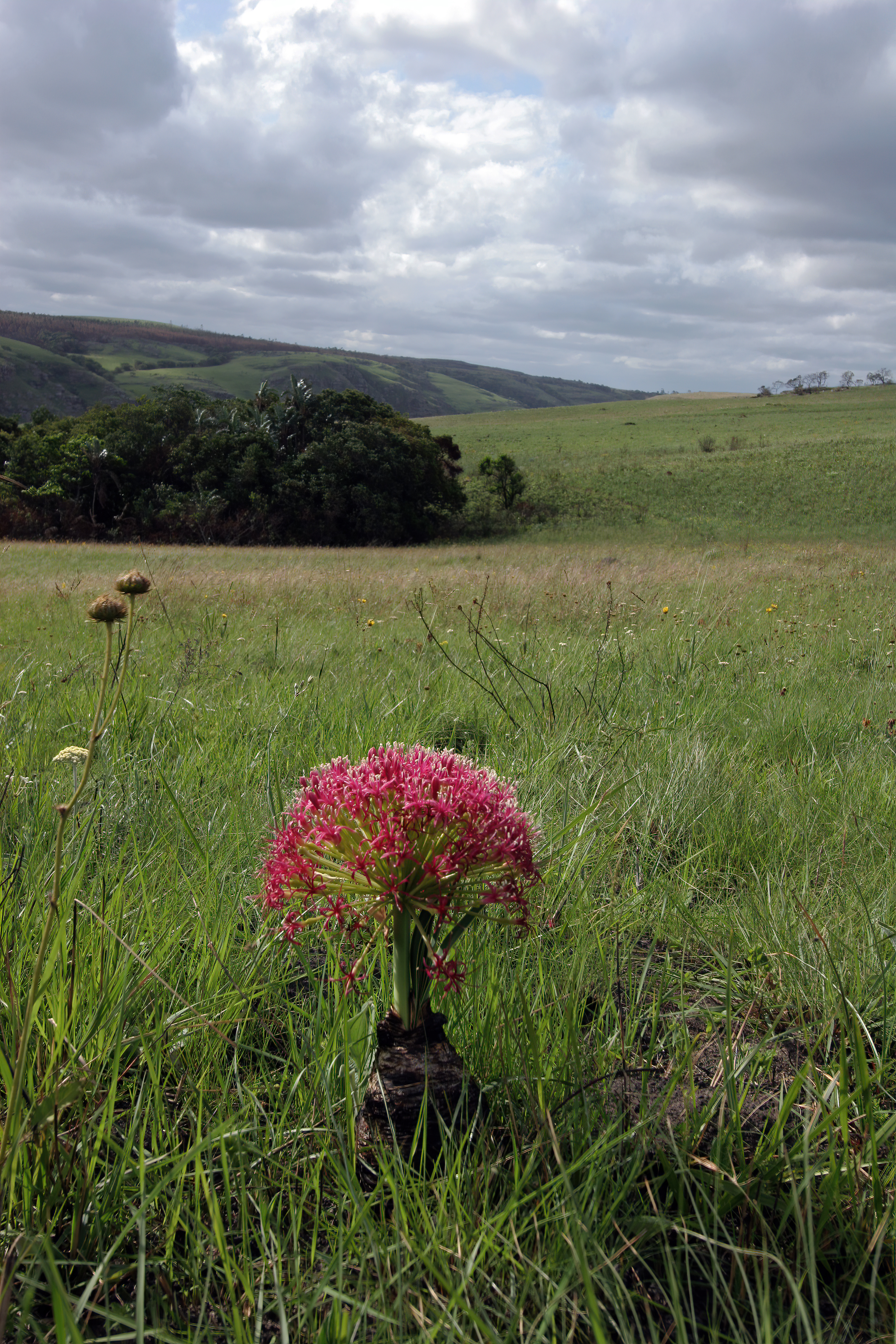
Lone bulb growing on recently-burned upland meadow

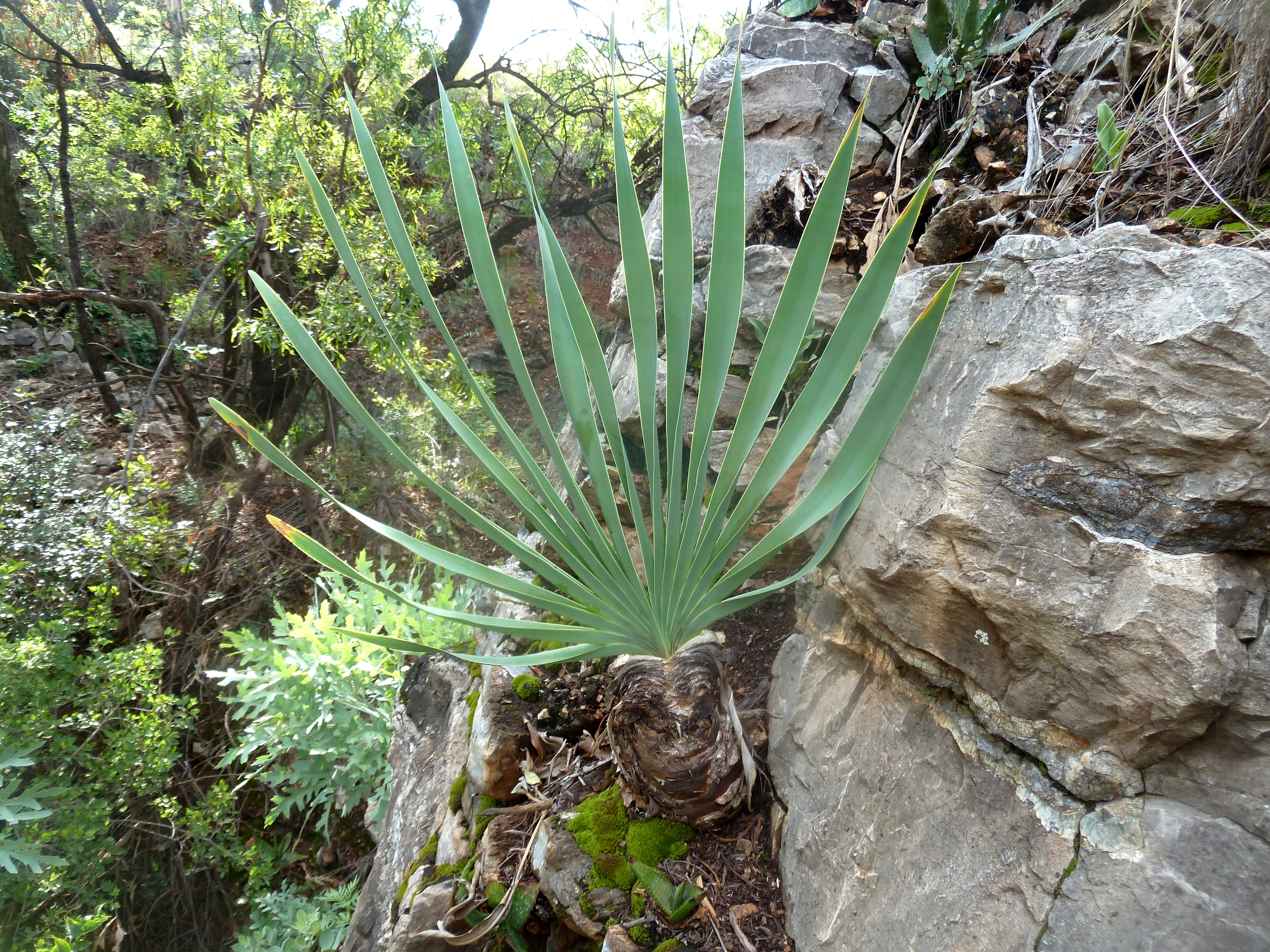
Single bulb growing chasmophytically on dolomitic limestone in light shade

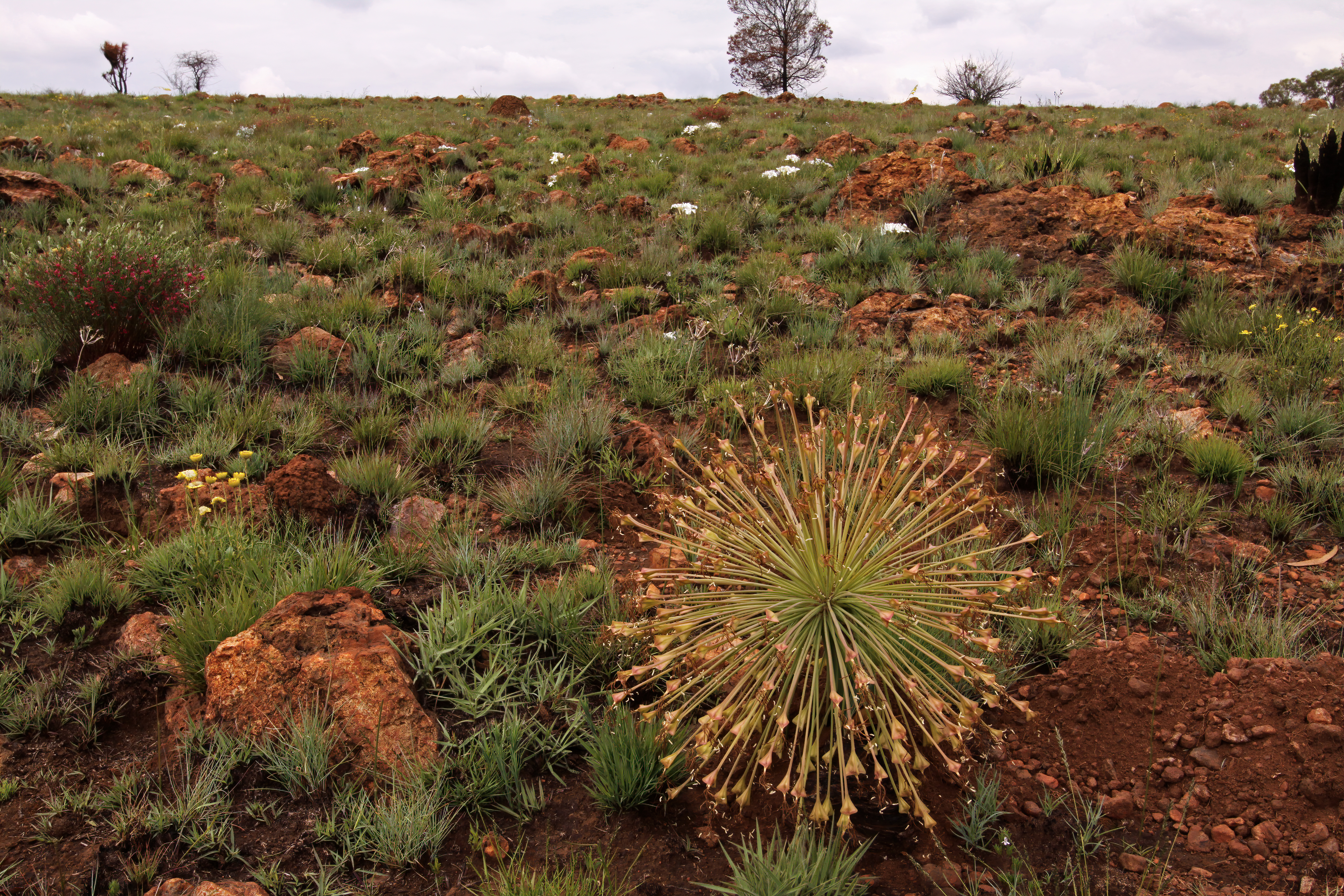
Habit of ripening, tumbleweed-type infructescence

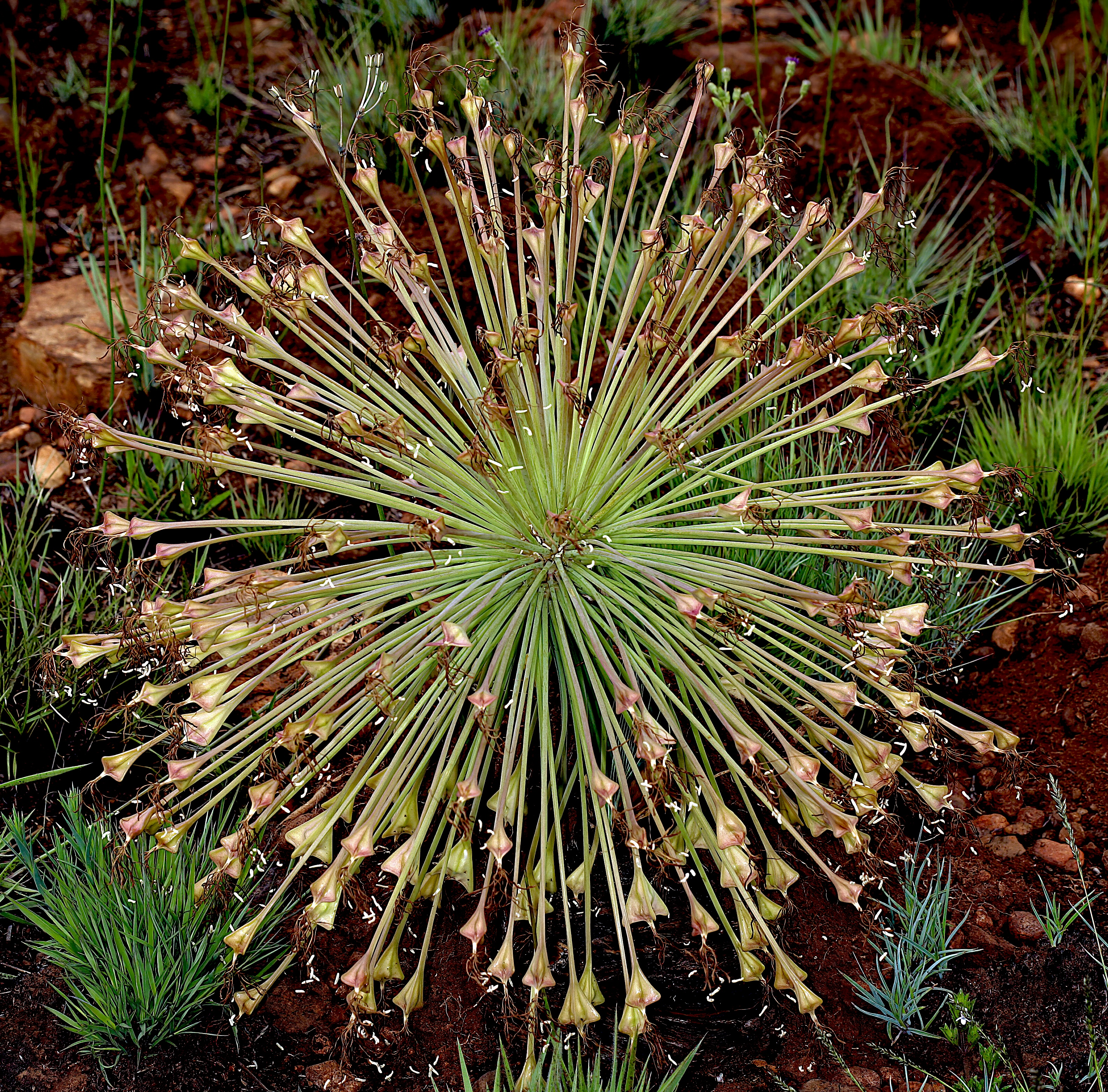
Close-up of infructescence

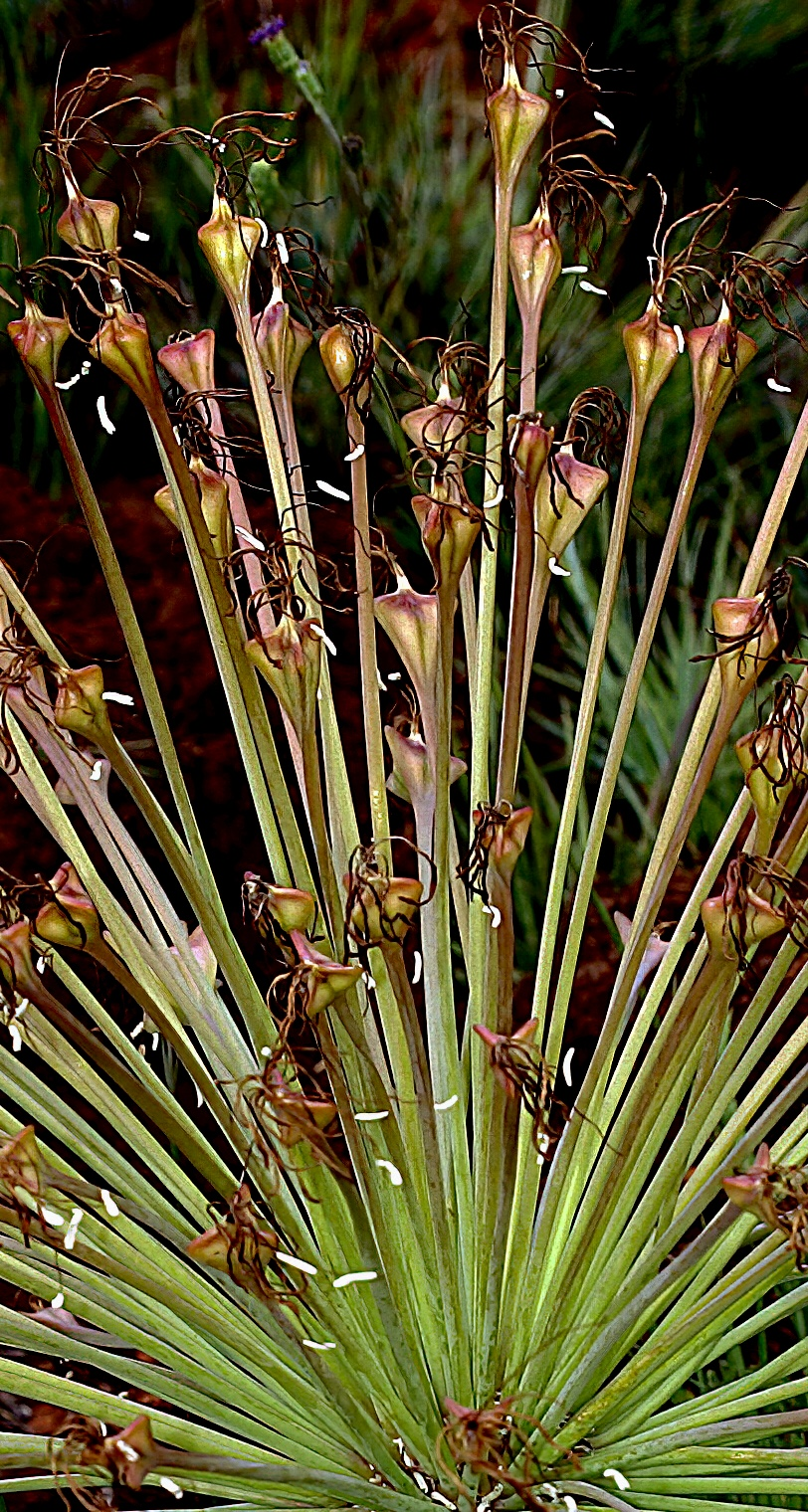
Detail of elongated pedicels and 3-angled seed capsules

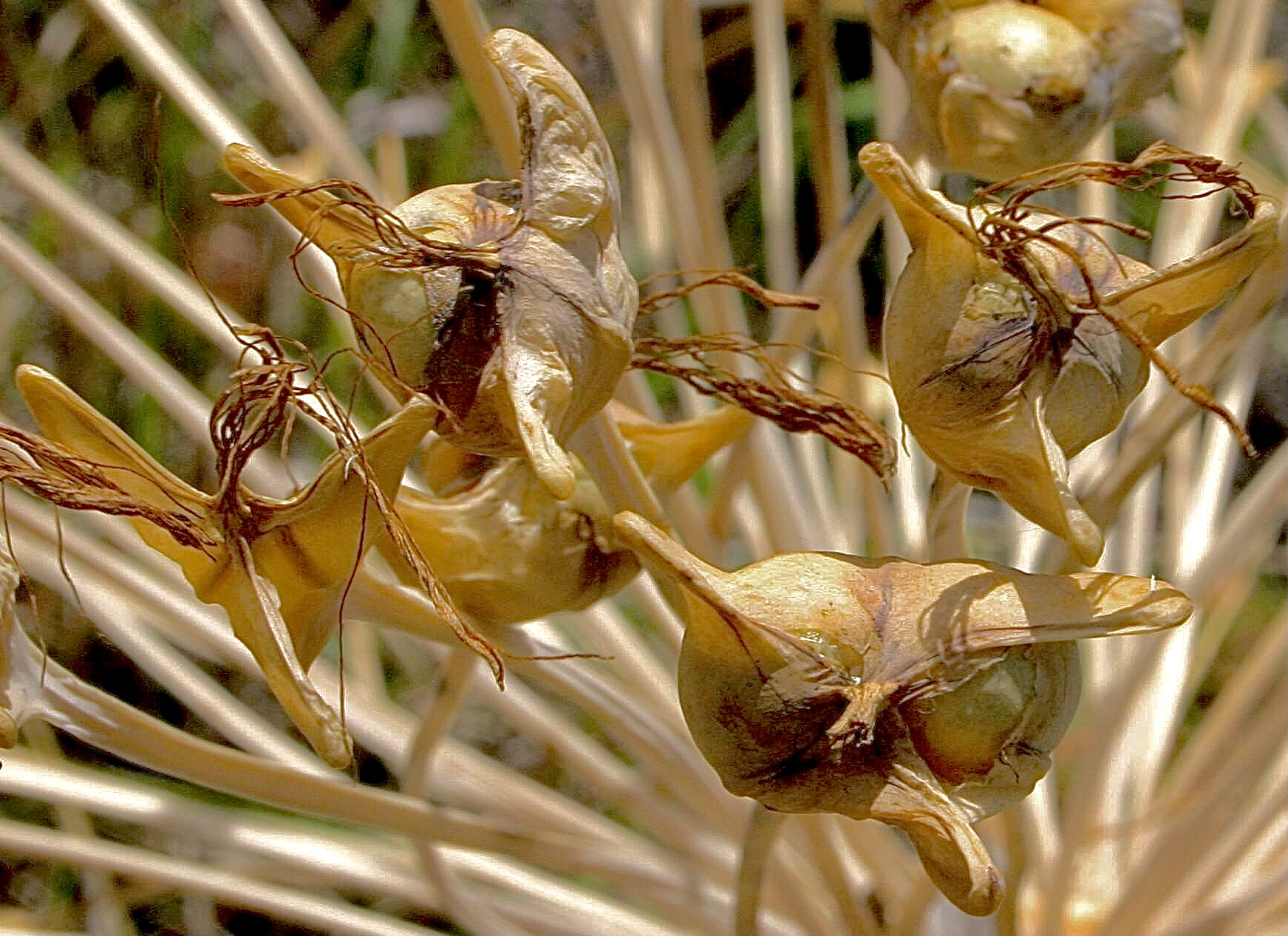
Close-up of ripe 3-horned capsules

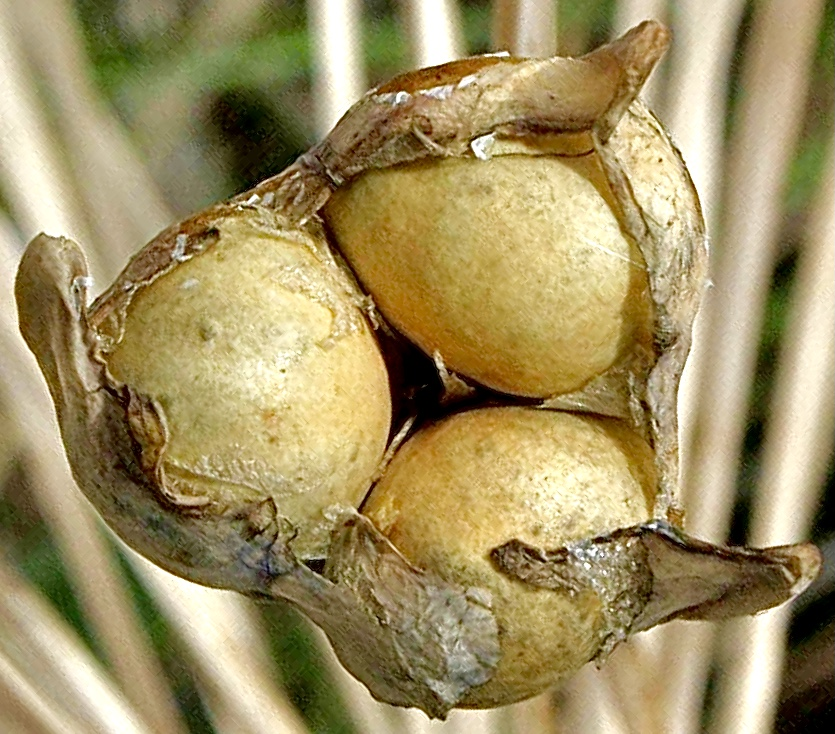
Single, dehiscent, tricorn seed capsule revealing 3 seeds

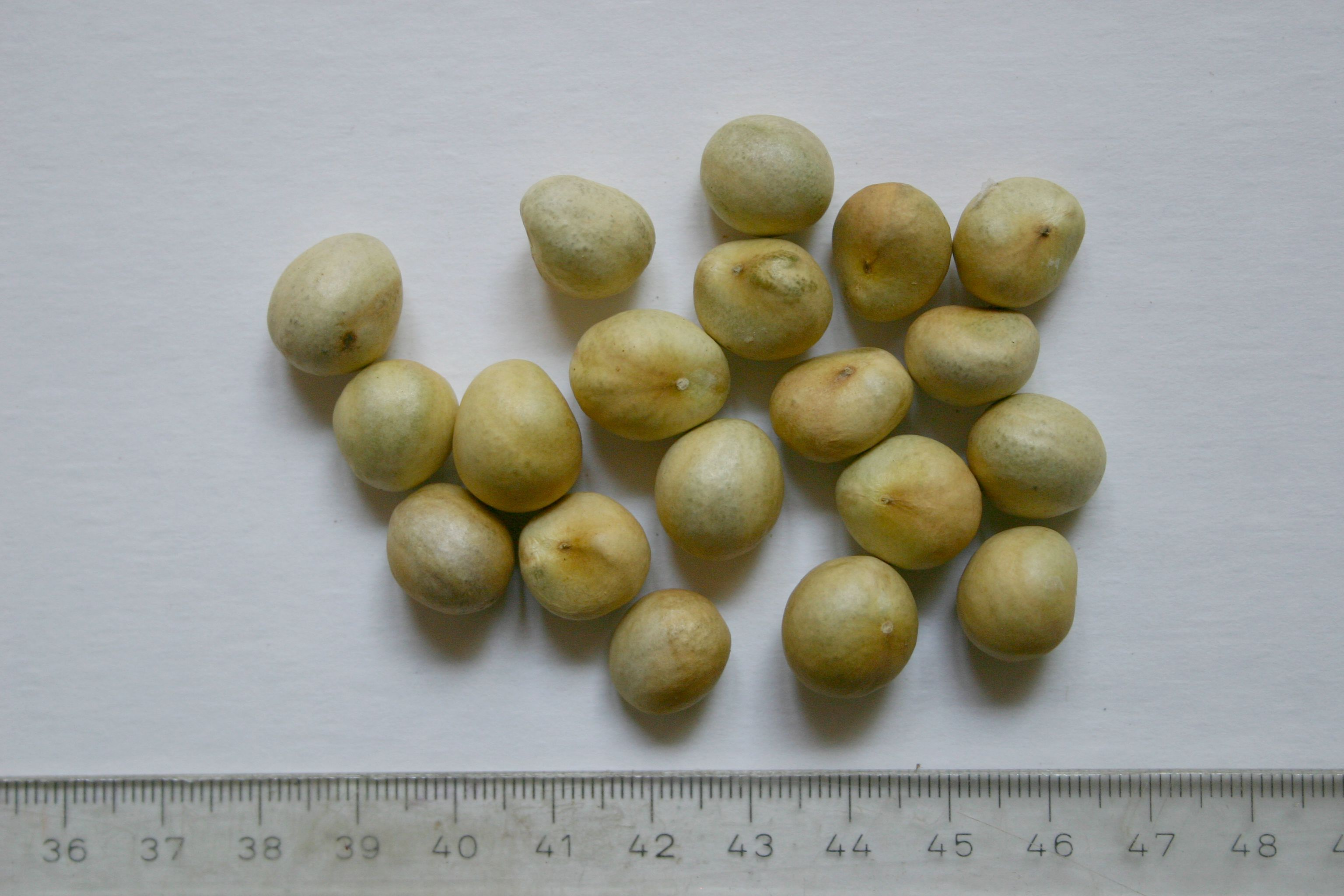
Large (circa 1 cm) globose seeds (with scale reference)

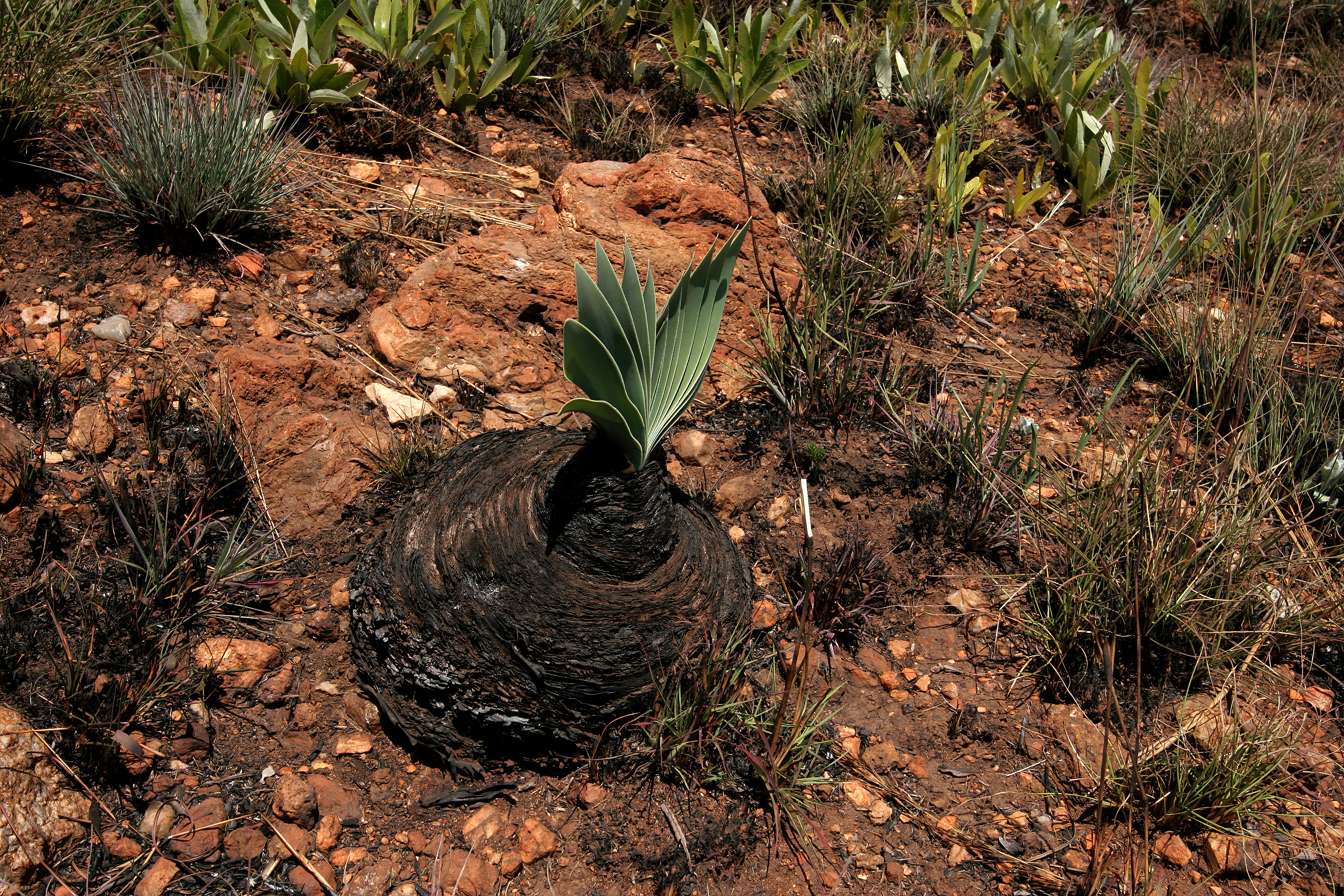
Young leaf fan emerging from bulb charred in brush fire

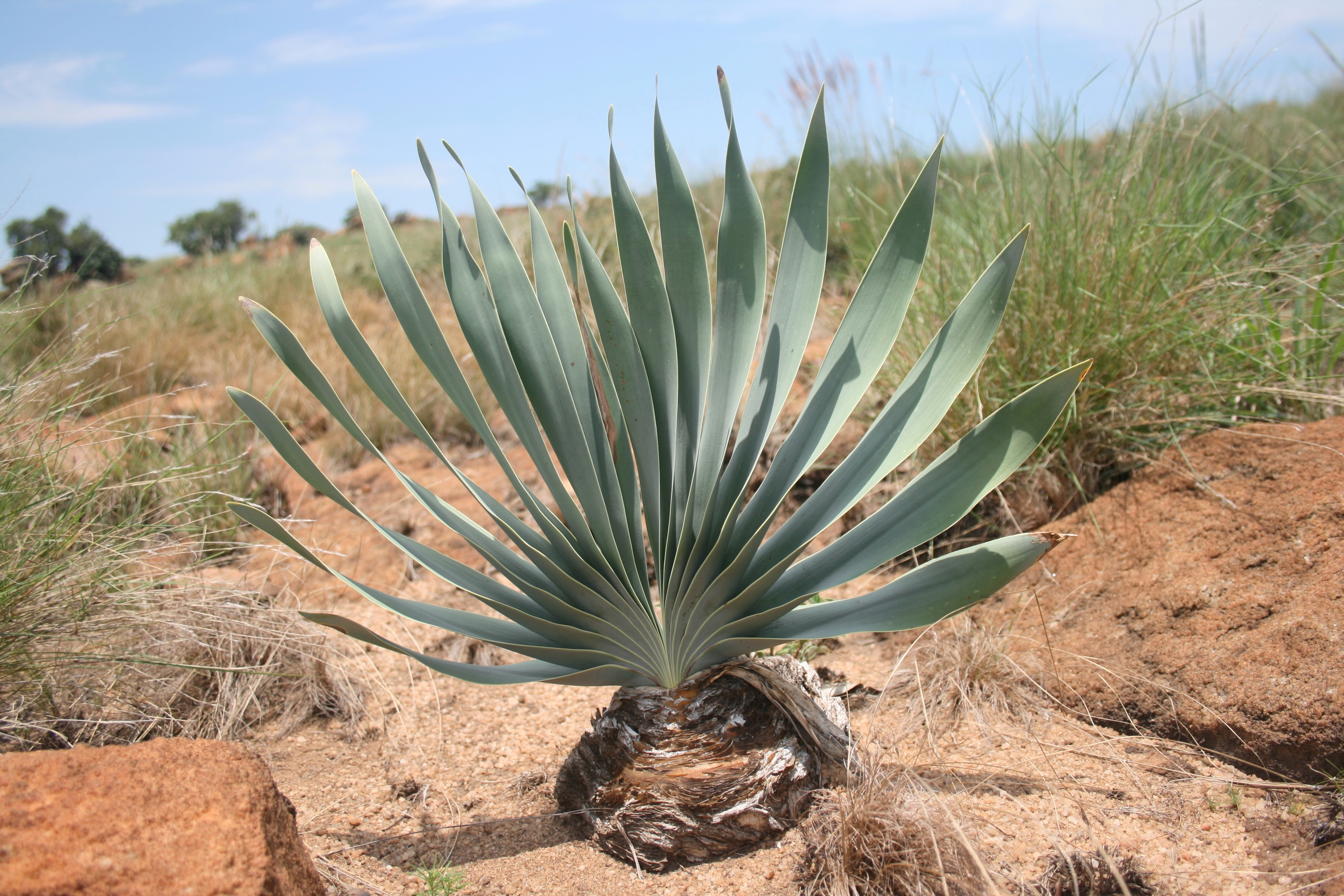
Mature leaf fan, showing characteristic distichous phyllotaxis

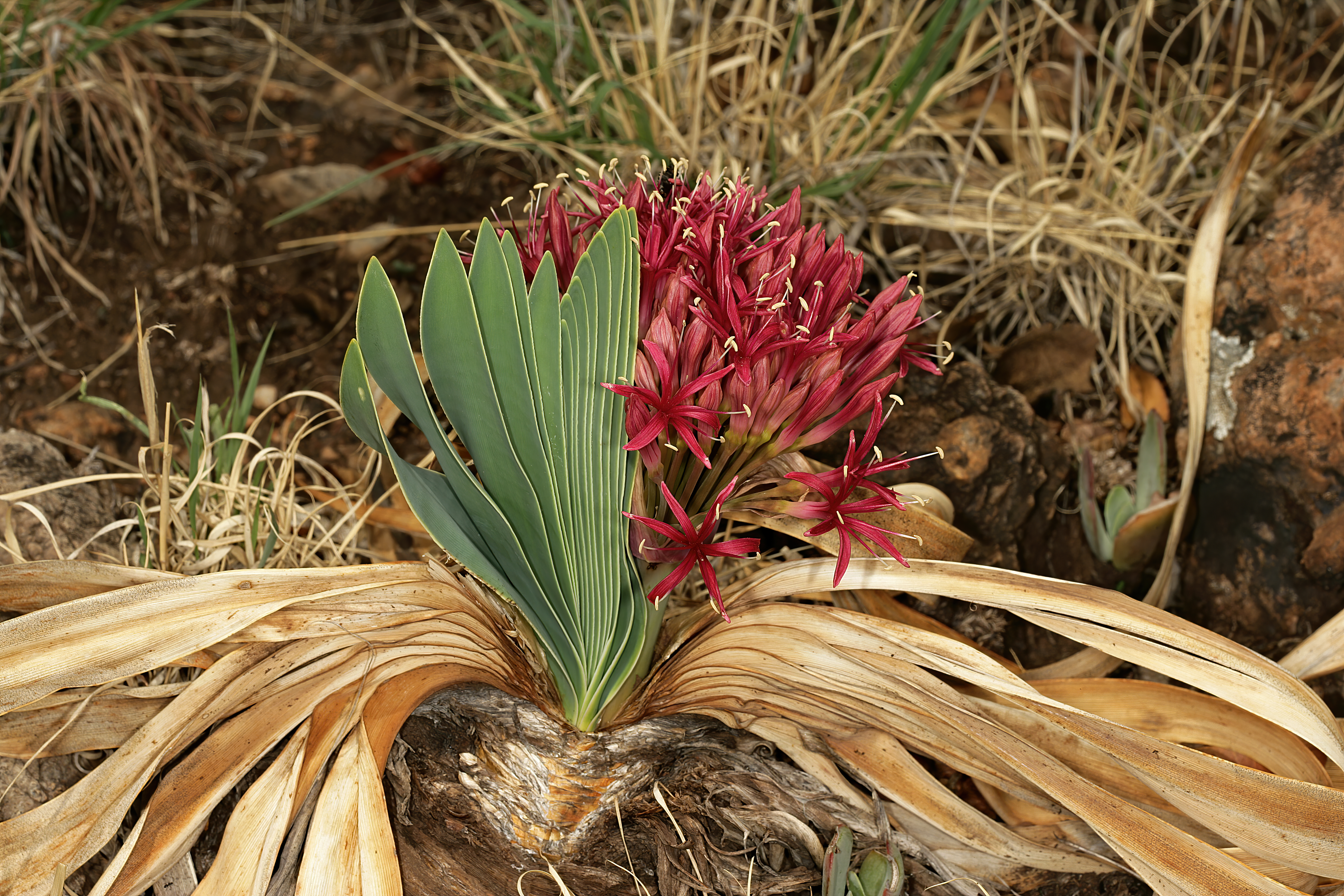
Atypical specimen, showing simultaneously inflorescence, leaves and last year's dead leaves

Insect visitors

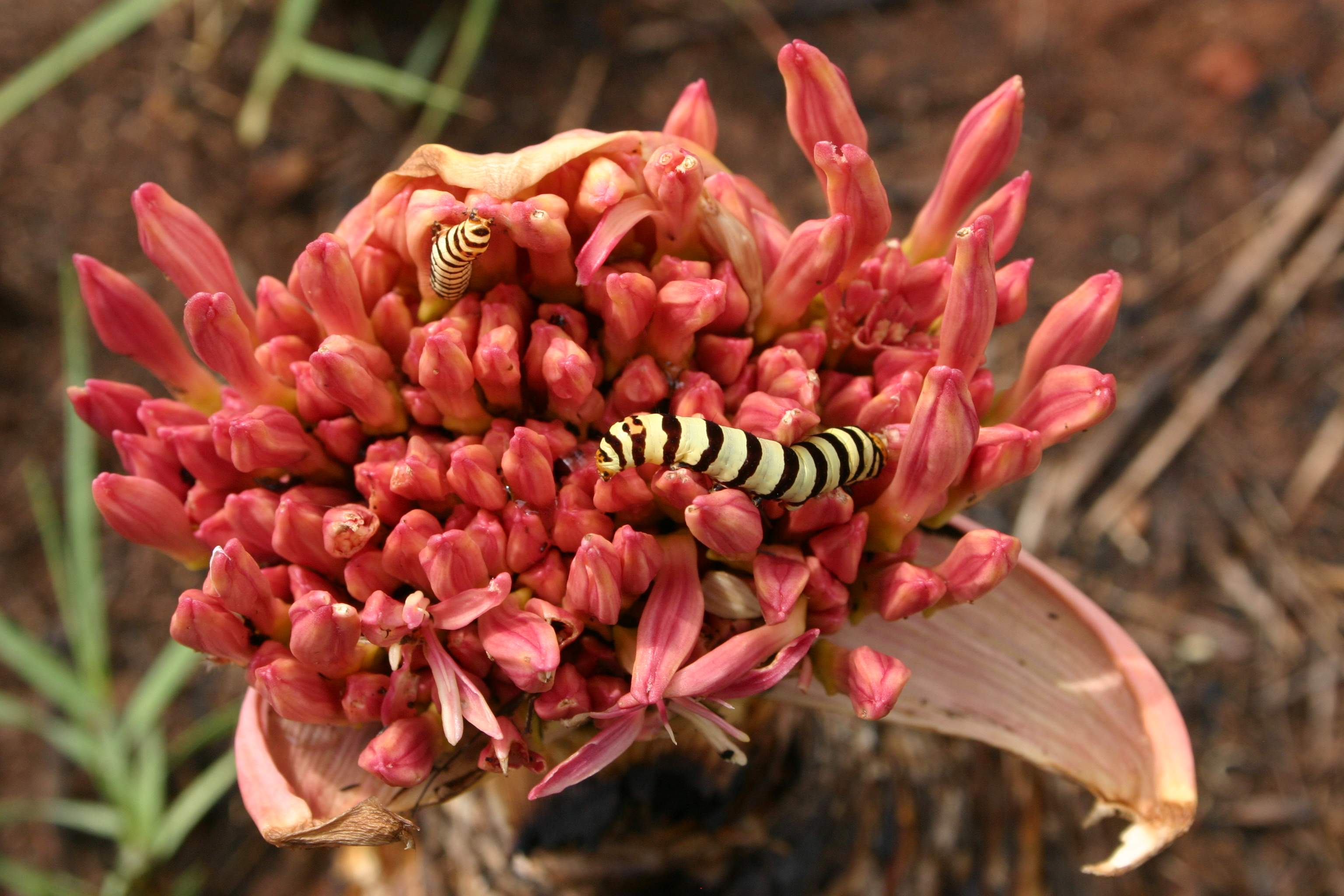
Larvae of Diaphone eumela, the cherry spot moth, feeding on inflorescence

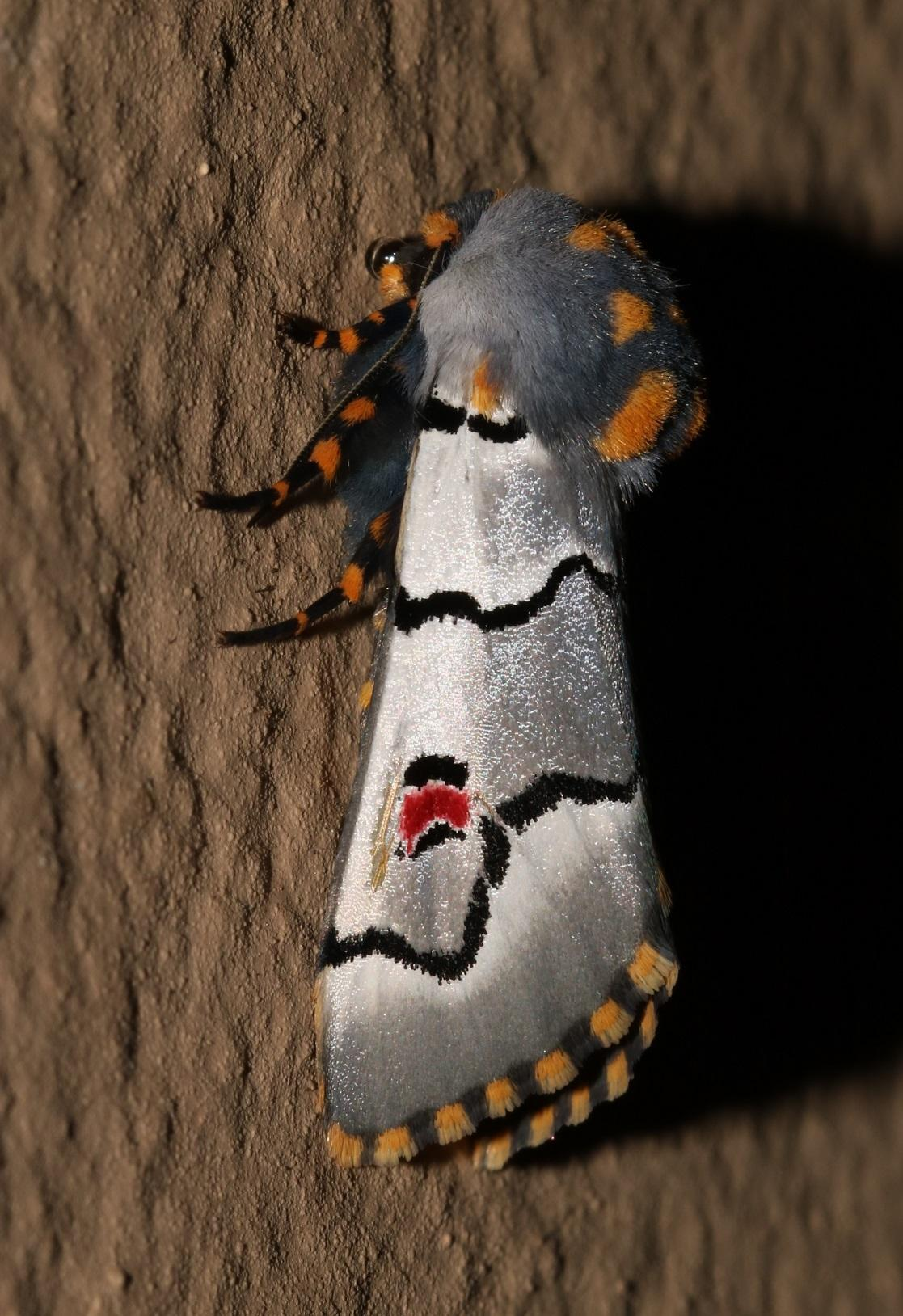
Diaphone eumela (cherry spot/lily borer) adult

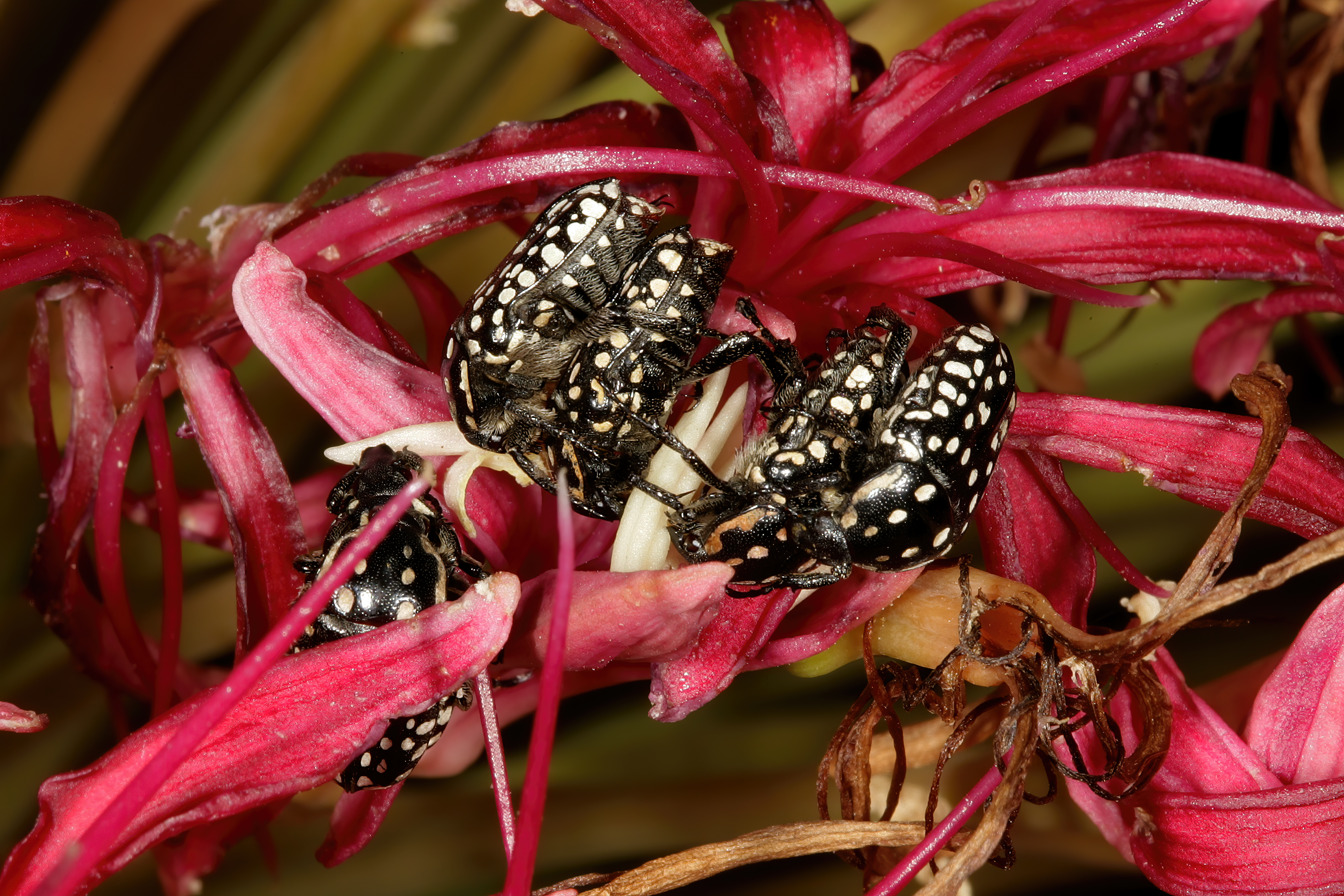
Adults of the scarab beetle Cyrtothyrea testaceoguttata mating on inflorescence

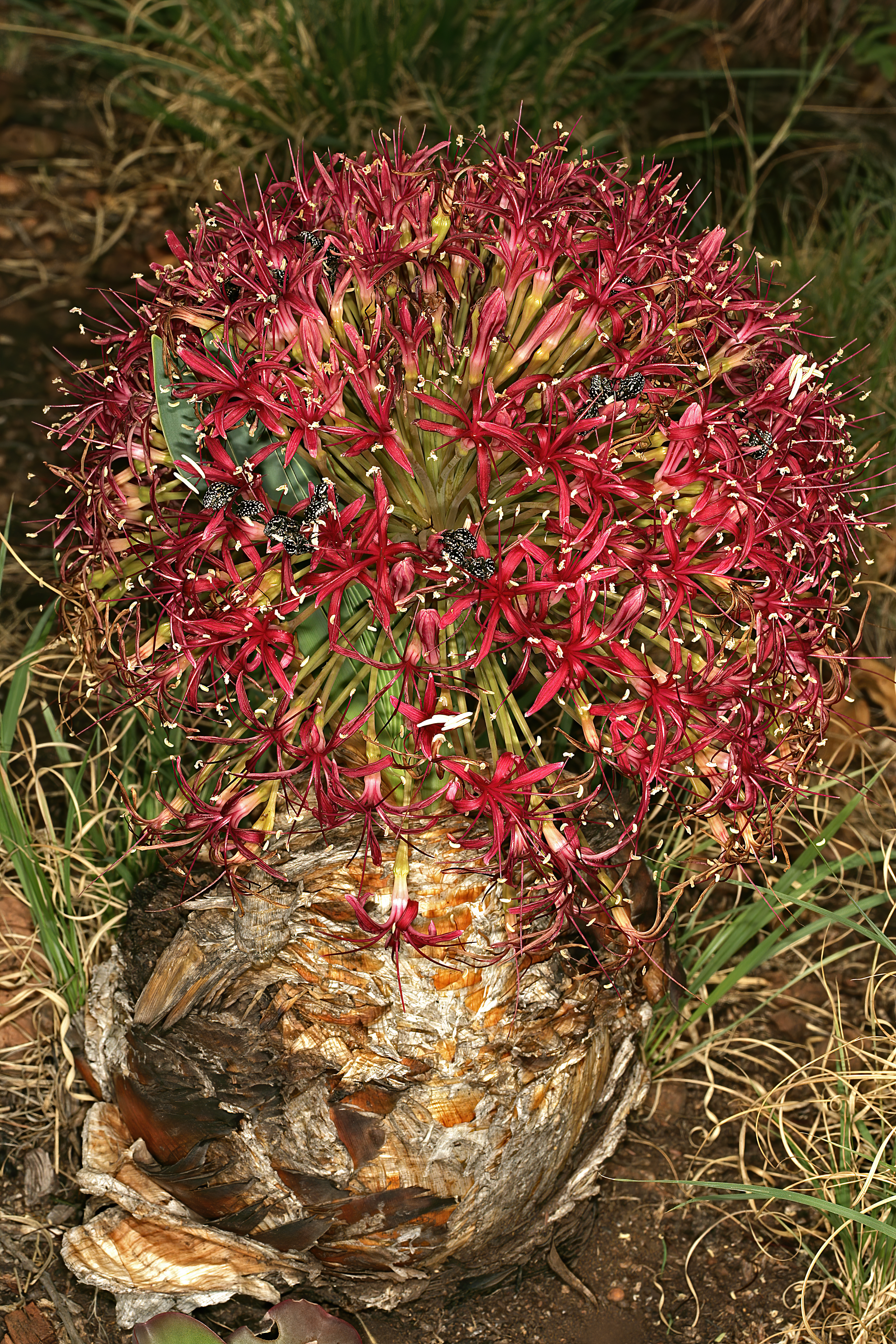
Long-shot of inflorescence covered in mating Cyrtothyrea testaceoguttata

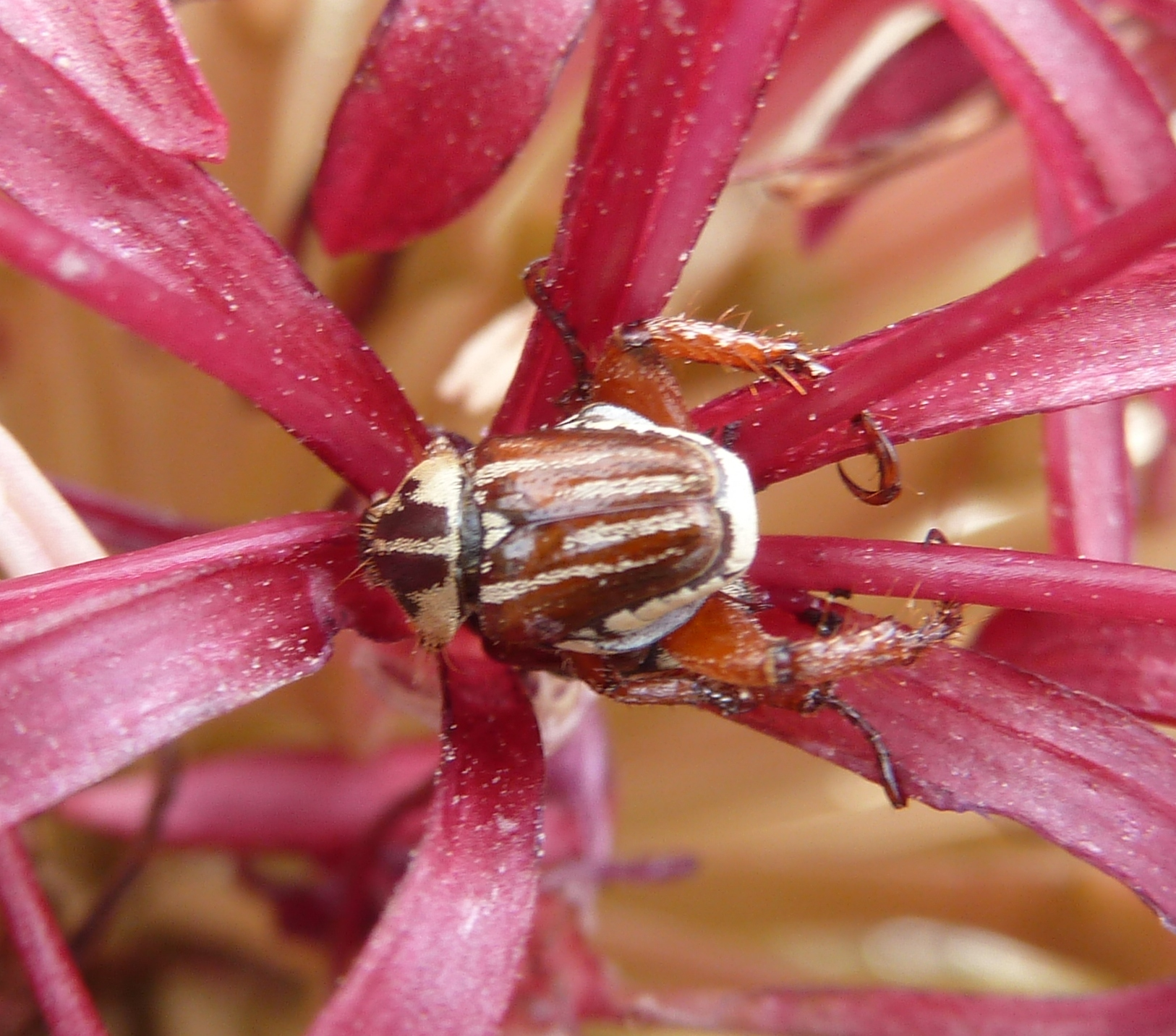
Scarab (Monkey beetle sp.) clinging to centre of single flower
