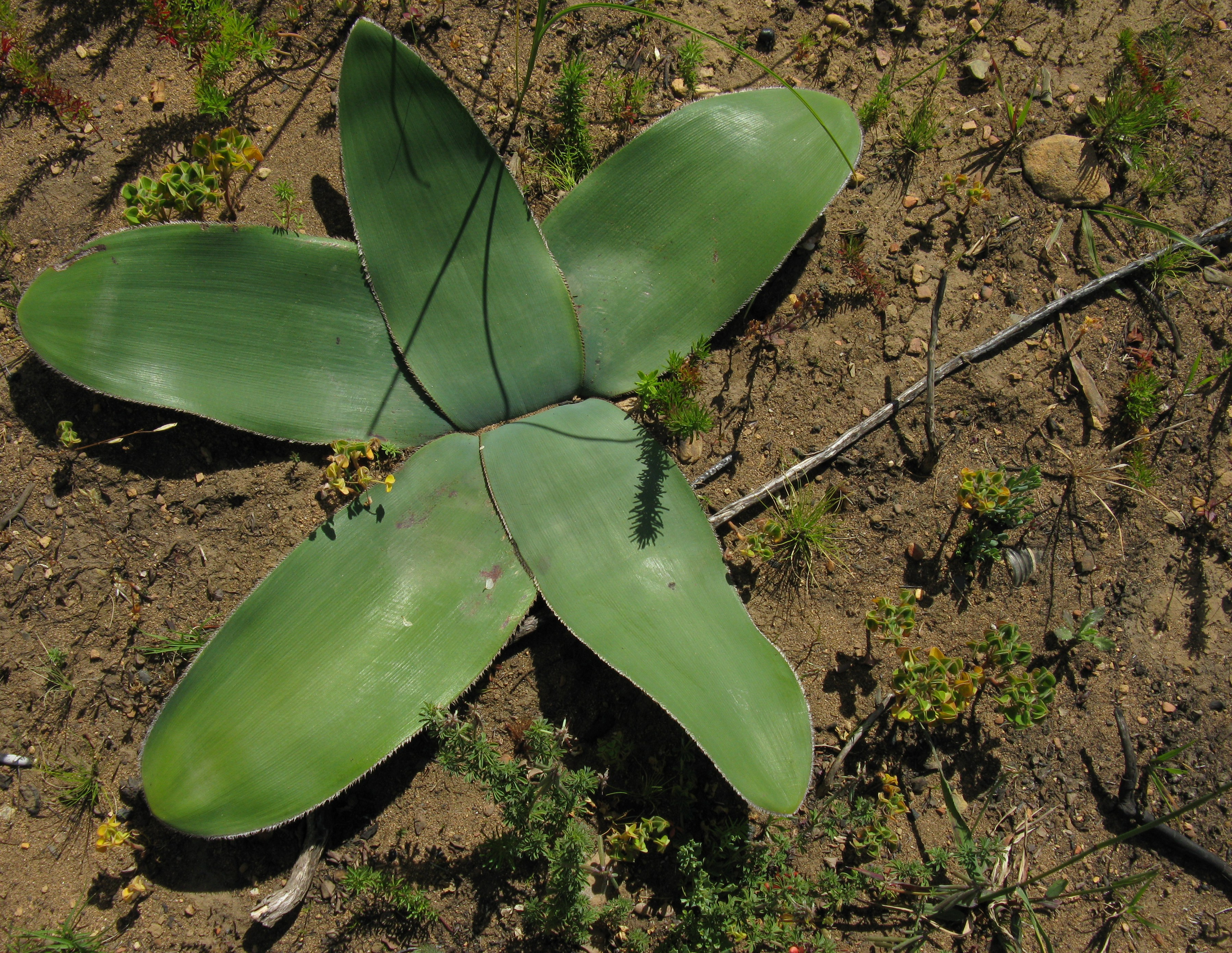

Scientific classification
- Kingdom: Plantae
- Clade: Tracheophytes
- Clade: Angiosperms
- Clade: Monocots
- Order: Asparagales
- Family: Amaryllidaceae
- Subfamily: Amaryllidoideae
- Genus: Crossyne
- Species: C. guttata

Binomial name
- Crossyne guttata (L.) D.Müll.-Doblies & U.Müll.-Doblies

Synonyms
- Amaryllis ciliaris L.; Amaryllis guttata L.; Boophone amaryllidea M.Roem.; Boophone ciliaris (L.) Herb.; Boophone guttata (L.) Herb.; Coburgia ciliaris (L.) Herb.; Crossyne ciliaris (L.) Salisb.; Haemanthus guttatus Banks ex Kunth

= Crossyne guttata =

Species of flowering plant

Crossyne guttata, commonly known as the parasol lily or April Fool lily, is a perennial, flowering plant and geophyte that is part of the Amaryllidaceae family. The plant is endemic to the Western Cape and is part of the fynbos.
