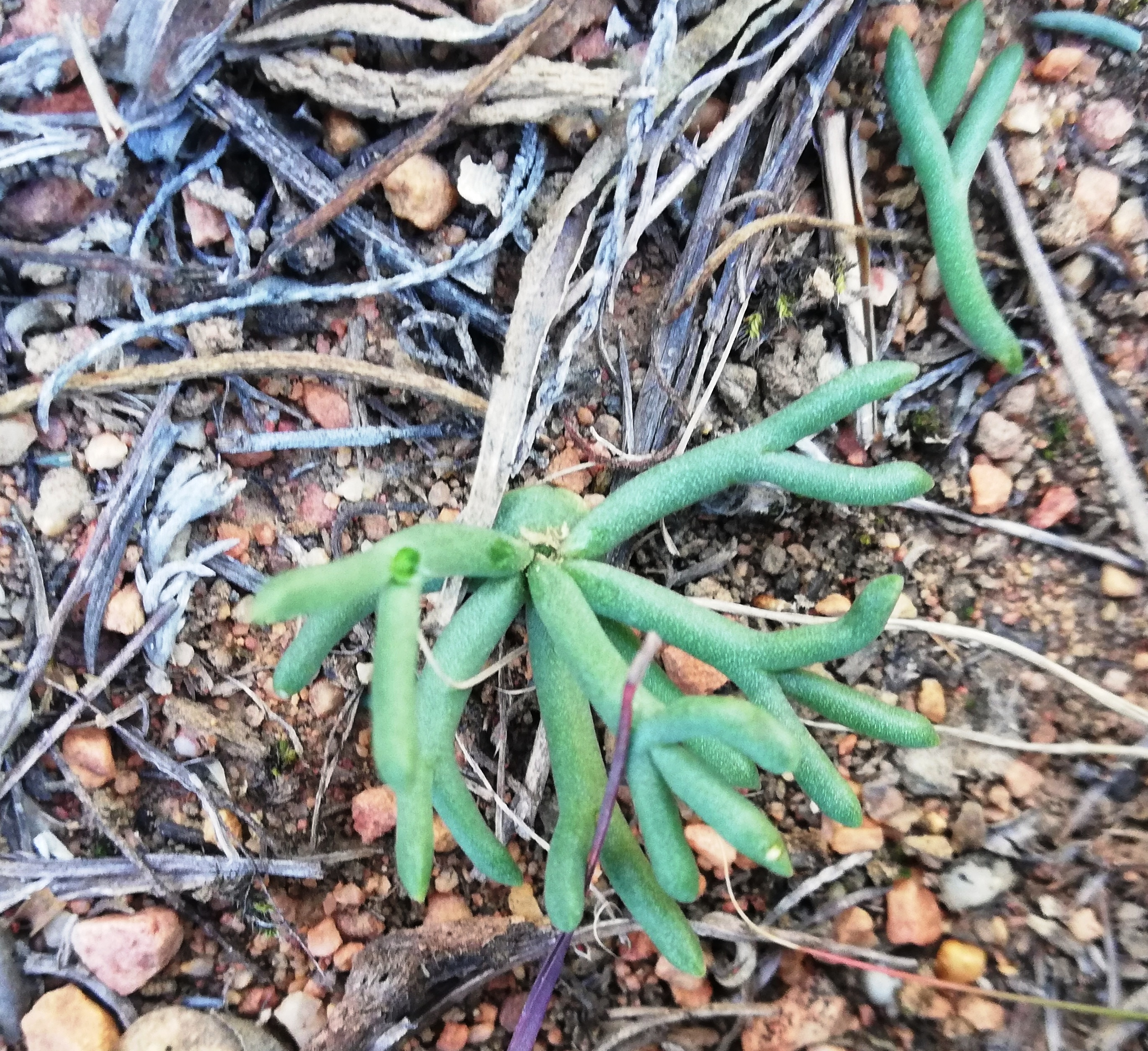

Scientific classification
- Kingdom: Plantae
- Clade: Tracheophytes
- Clade: Angiosperms
- Clade: Monocots
- Order: Asparagales
- Family: Asparagaceae
- Subfamily: Nolinoideae
- Genus: Eriospermum
- Species: E. bowieanum

Binomial name
- Eriospermum bowieanum Baker

= Eriospermum bowieanum =

Species of flowering plant

Eriospermum bowieanum is a species of geophytic plant of the genus Eriospermum, endemic to the Robertson Karoo region of the Western Cape Province, South Africa.

== Habitat ==
This species is endemic to the Robertson Karoo region. Its habitat is rocky, clay-rich, shale derived soils in the Shale Renosterveld and Alluvium Fynbos vegetation types, in arid areas between the towns of Worcester and Ashton. It also extends as far as Montagu in the east, and Riviersonderend in the south.

This species co-occurs with several close relatives such as Eriospermum bayeri, Eriospermum pubescens, Eriospermum proliferum, Eriospermum capense and Eriospermum paradoxum, among others.
