= Eriospermum proliferum =

Scientific classification
- Kingdom: Plantae
- Clade: Tracheophytes
- Clade: Angiosperms
- Clade: Monocots
- Order: Asparagales
- Family: Asparagaceae
- Subfamily: Nolinoideae
- Genus: Eriospermum
- Species: E. proliferum

Binomial name
- Eriospermum proliferum Baker

Synonyms
- Eriospermum fasciculatum A.V.Duthie; Eriospermum folioliferum Ker Gawl. Eriospermum setiferum Poelln.

Species of flowering plant

Eriospermum proliferum is a species of flowering plant in the Asparagaceae family.

== Description ==
The single leaf appears in April to October. It has multiple, thin, hair-like enations that (unlike Eriospermum paradoxum) are un-branched. The leaf-sheath is hairy. The tuber can sometimes be stoloniferous and spreading.

The flowers appear in February and March. They are white and triangular outlined, with widely ovate filaments (very similar to those of Eriospermum pubescens).

== Distribution and habitat ==
This species is widespread to the south western Cape, South Africa, in the Robertson Karoo, the far western edge of the Overberg region, the western edge of the Little Karoo and surrounding areas of the Western Cape Province. In the north, its range extends along the western edge of the Northern Cape Province.

Its preferred habitat is rocky areas in sandy-to-clay soils, in shaded places in Fynbos, Renosterveld and Succulent Karoo vegetation types.
