= Eriospermum graminifolium =

Scientific classification
- Kingdom: Plantae
- Clade: Tracheophytes
- Clade: Angiosperms
- Clade: Monocots
- Order: Asparagales
- Family: Asparagaceae
- Subfamily: Nolinoideae
- Genus: Eriospermum
- Species: E. graminifolium

Binomial name
- Eriospermum graminifolium A.V. Duthie

Species of flowering plant

Eriospermum graminifolium is a species of geophytic plant of the genus Eriospermum, indigenous to South Africa.

== Description ==
This is one of several species that have slender, lanceolate leaves, including Eriospermum exile, Eriospermum bayeri and Eriospermum lanceifolium.

The leaf of Eriospermum graminifolium is leathery, slender, lanceolate and grass-like (100mm x 9mm). Usually the faintly hairy sides of the leaves are curved upwards, to the point where the leaf can seem partly rolled up. The irregular-shaped tuber is pinkish inside. The white flowers appear on a slender inflorescence in February to April.

Eriospermum graminifolium occurs in sandy or clay soils, in the south western Cape, extending as far east as the town of George.
