= Eriospermum breviscapum =

Scientific classification
- Kingdom: Plantae
- Clade: Tracheophytes
- Clade: Angiosperms
- Clade: Monocots
- Order: Asparagales
- Family: Asparagaceae
- Subfamily: Nolinoideae
- Genus: Eriospermum
- Species: E. breviscapum

Binomial name
- Eriospermum breviscapum Marloth ex p. L. Perry

Species of flowering plant

Eriospermum breviscapum is a species of geophytic plant of the genus Eriospermum, indigenous to South Africa.

== Description ==
This species has a fleshy, prostrate, heart-shaped-to-rounded leaf (60mm x 80mm). Its leaf resembles that of Eriospermum zeyheri, which has a different distribution range, occurring in the southern Karoo between Barrydale and Grahamstown.

It has a short peduncle, compact inflorescence and fragrant, star-like white flowers that appear on the short, conical raceme in February to March.

Several related species, such as Eriospermum capense, Eriospermum pubescens and Eriospermum zeyheri, have a similar heart-shaped leaf.

== Distribution and habitat ==
It is a winter rainfall species, endemic to South Africa. It is indigenous to flat rocky shale or clay areas in the Robertson Karoo, and from Robertson as far as Still Bay in the south east. It occurs in Renosterveld and Succulent Karoo vegetation.
