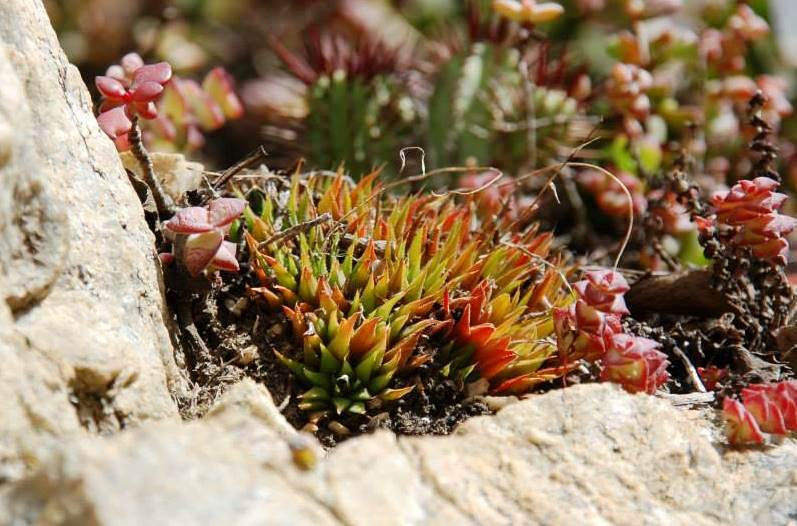
- H. chlorocantha in habitat

Scientific classification
- Kingdom: Plantae
- Clade: Tracheophytes
- Clade: Angiosperms
- Clade: Monocots
- Order: Asparagales
- Family: Asphodelaceae
- Subfamily: Asphodeloideae
- Genus: Haworthia
- Species: H. chloracantha

Binomial name
- Haworthia chloracantha Haw.

= Haworthia chloracantha =

Species of flowering plant

Haworthia chloracantha is a species of succulent plant native to the Cape Province of South Africa. H. chloracantha has typically pale yellow-green leaves and is somewhat similar to Haworthia reticulata in form, but the leaves are opaque rather than translucent. It forms prolific clusters of plants. The plant has a few subvarieties including var. denticulifera, meaning has small teeth on its leaves, and var. subglauca, which has darker foliage.
