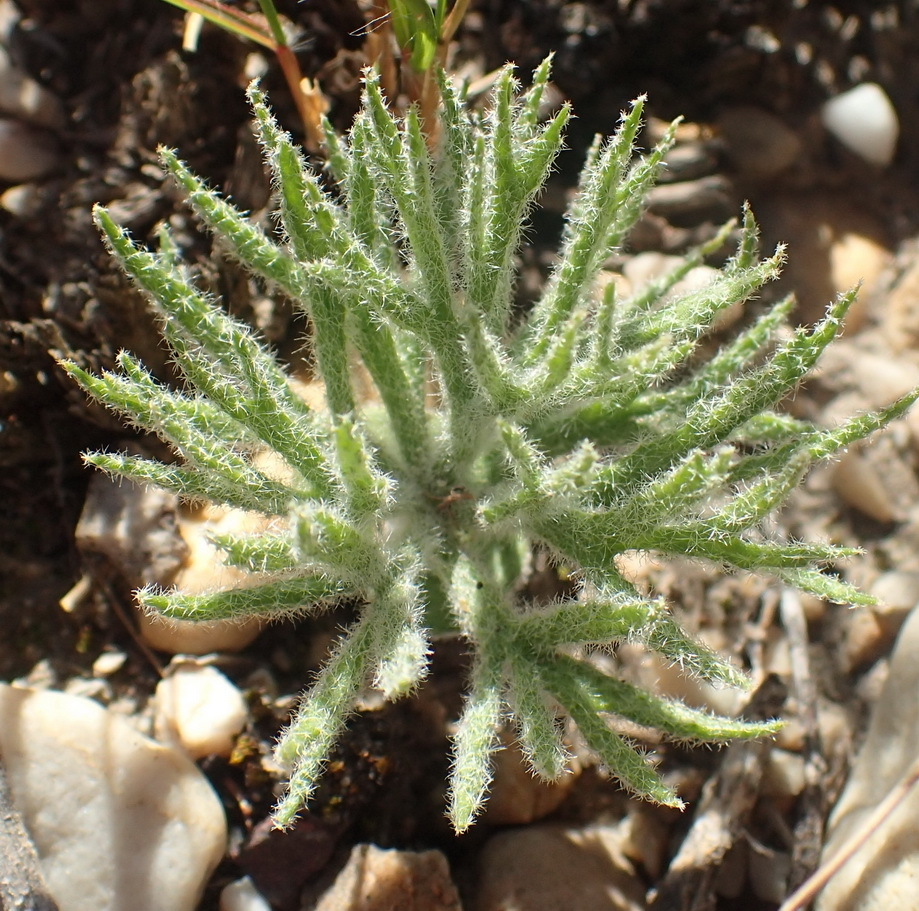

Scientific classification
- Kingdom: Plantae
- Clade: Tracheophytes
- Clade: Angiosperms
- Clade: Monocots
- Order: Asparagales
- Family: Asparagaceae
- Subfamily: Convallarioideae
- Genus: Eriospermum
- Species: E. dregei

Binomial name
- Eriospermum dregei Schönland

= Eriospermum dregei =

Species of flowering plant

Eriospermum dregei is a species of geophytic plant of the family Asparagaceae.

This species has stellate hairs on its branching leaf enations, causing its leaves to appear woolly. The leaf of Eriospermum paradoxum has a similar appearance, but with finer enations.

It is indigenous to rocky or clay areas, especially in red soils and Pentzia veld, in the Little Karoo, South Africa. It occurs from Montagu in the west, to Prince Albert in the north, and eastwards as far as Port Elizabeth.
