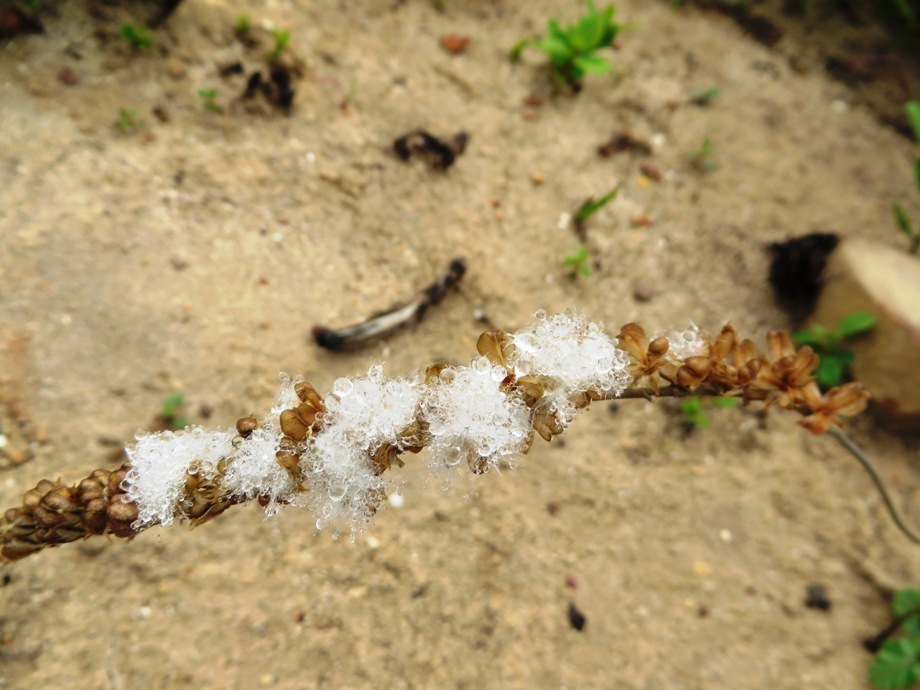

Scientific classification
- Kingdom: Plantae
- Clade: Tracheophytes
- Clade: Angiosperms
- Clade: Monocots
- Order: Asparagales
- Family: Asparagaceae
- Subfamily: Nolinoideae
- Genus: Eriospermum
- Species: E. lanceifolium

Binomial name
- Eriospermum lanceifolium jacquin

= Eriospermum lanceifolium =

Species of flowering plant

Eriospermum lanceifolium is a species of geophytic plant of the genus Eriospermum.

== Description ==
Eriospermum lanceifolium bears a single, erect, slender (16 cm x 4–5 cm), lanceolate leaf, with undulate (sometimes hairy) margins. The leaf is a blue colour; it is a tough, leathery texture.

Eriospermum lanceifolium has a lumpy irregular tuber, which is pinkish inside.

=== Related species ===
This is one of several Eriospermum species that have erect, slender, lanceolate leaves, including Eriospermum exile, Eriospermum graminifolium and Eriospermum bayeri.

== Distribution and habitat ==
It is indigenous to granite or sandstone soils in the Western Cape, South Africa. It occurs from the Olifants River mountains as far as the town of Albertinia.
