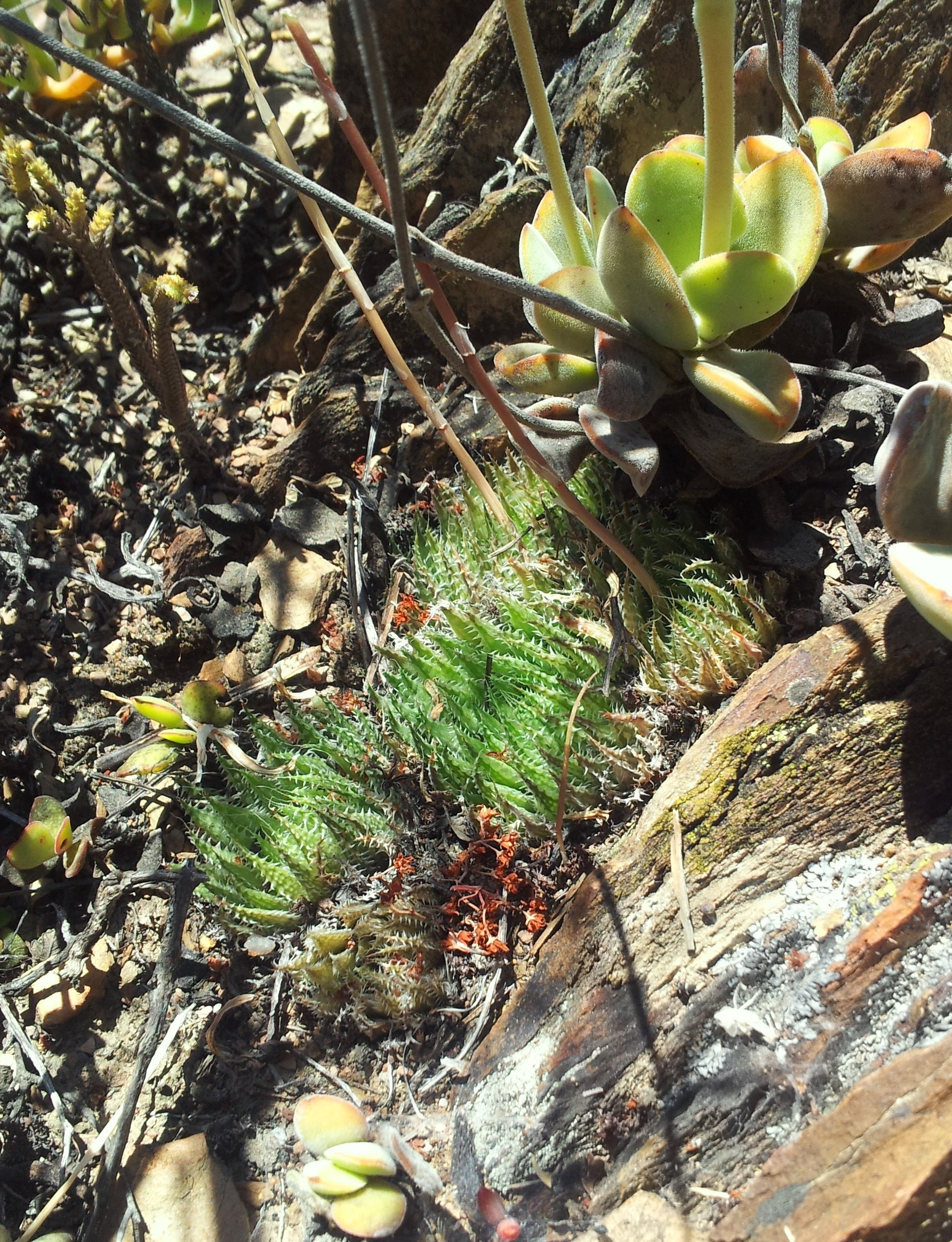
- H. herbacea in the Karoo Desert National Botanical Garden

Scientific classification
- Kingdom: Plantae
- Clade: Tracheophytes
- Clade: Angiosperms
- Clade: Monocots
- Order: Asparagales
- Family: Asphodelaceae
- Subfamily: Asphodeloideae
- Genus: Haworthia
- Species: H. herbacea

Binomial name
- Haworthia herbacea (Mill.) Stearn

= Haworthia herbacea =

Species of flowering plant

Haworthia herbacea is a species of succulent plant in the genus Haworthia native to the Cape Province of South Africa. Closely related to Haworthia reticulata, it has greenish yellow leaves with small spines. As it matures the leaves get darker green and the white spots raise. Flowers by way of a shoot and produces a large off-white flower.
