= Eriospermum zeyheri =

Scientific classification
- Kingdom: Plantae
- Clade: Tracheophytes
- Clade: Angiosperms
- Clade: Monocots
- Order: Asparagales
- Family: Asparagaceae
- Subfamily: Nolinoideae
- Genus: Eriospermum
- Species: E. zeyheri

Binomial name
- Eriospermum zeyheri R.A. Dyer

Species of flowering plant

Eriospermum zeyheri is a species of geophytic plant of the genus Eriospermum, indigenous to South Africa.

== Description ==
The leaf is a rounded heart-shape (100 mm × 65 mm (3.9 in × 2.6 in)), and is prostrate, held flat against the ground. Several related species, such as Eriospermum capense, Eriospermum breviscapum and Eriospermum pubescens, have a similar heart-shaped leaf. However, the leaf of E.zeyheri is generally a lighter green above, and not a reddish colour below. It is also always pressed flat against the ground.

The irregular-shaped tuber of E.zeyheri is white-ish inside.

The pale, greenish-cream-coloured, fragrant, star-shaped flowers appear on a tall, thin inflorescence in December to March.

== Distribution ==
This species occurs in renosterveld vegetation, in clay soils, across the southern Cape, South Africa, extending from McGregor as far east as the town of Grahamstown.
