= Eriospermum bayeri =

Scientific classification
- Kingdom: Plantae
- Clade: Embryophytes
- Clade: Tracheophytes
- Clade: Angiosperms
- Clade: Monocots
- Order: Asparagales
- Family: Asparagaceae
- Subfamily: Convallarioideae
- Genus: Eriospermum
- Species: E. bayeri

Binomial name
- Eriospermum bayeri Perry

Species of flowering plant

Eriospermum bayeri is a species of geophytic plant of the genus Eriospermum, indigenous to the Western Cape Province, South Africa.

== Description ==
This species has a single, erect, slender, lanceolate-attenuate, petiolate leaf (100mm x 25mm), which has slightly wavy margins. The leaf appears from April to October (southern hemisphere). The tuber is irregular or slightly pear-shaped.

The flowers appear after the leaf is already dry, from March until May, on a thin, slender raceme.

=== Related species ===
This is one of several species that have slender, erect, lanceolate or linear leaves, including Eriospermum exile, Eriospermum graminifolium and Eriospermum lanceifolium.

Eriospermum lanceifolium also has an erect, lanceolate leaf, but its leaf is larger (160mm long; 48mm wide) than that of E.bayeri (100mm long; 25mm wide), and its leaf has a margin that is more strongly undulate, and often hairy. The leaf of Eriospermum lanceifolium is also a blue-green colour and has a leathery texture.

Vegetatively it resembles Eriospermum crispum, a species known only from Calitzdorp, but the lamina of the latter species is more firm and crisped.

== Distribution and habitat ==
Eriospermum bayeri is indigenous to the south western Cape, in the Robertson Karoo, from Worcester eastwards into the western Little Karoo and northwards into the Tanqua Karoo.

It is usually found on low, flat but rocky terrain, usually on shale, often in shale renosterveld vegetation.
