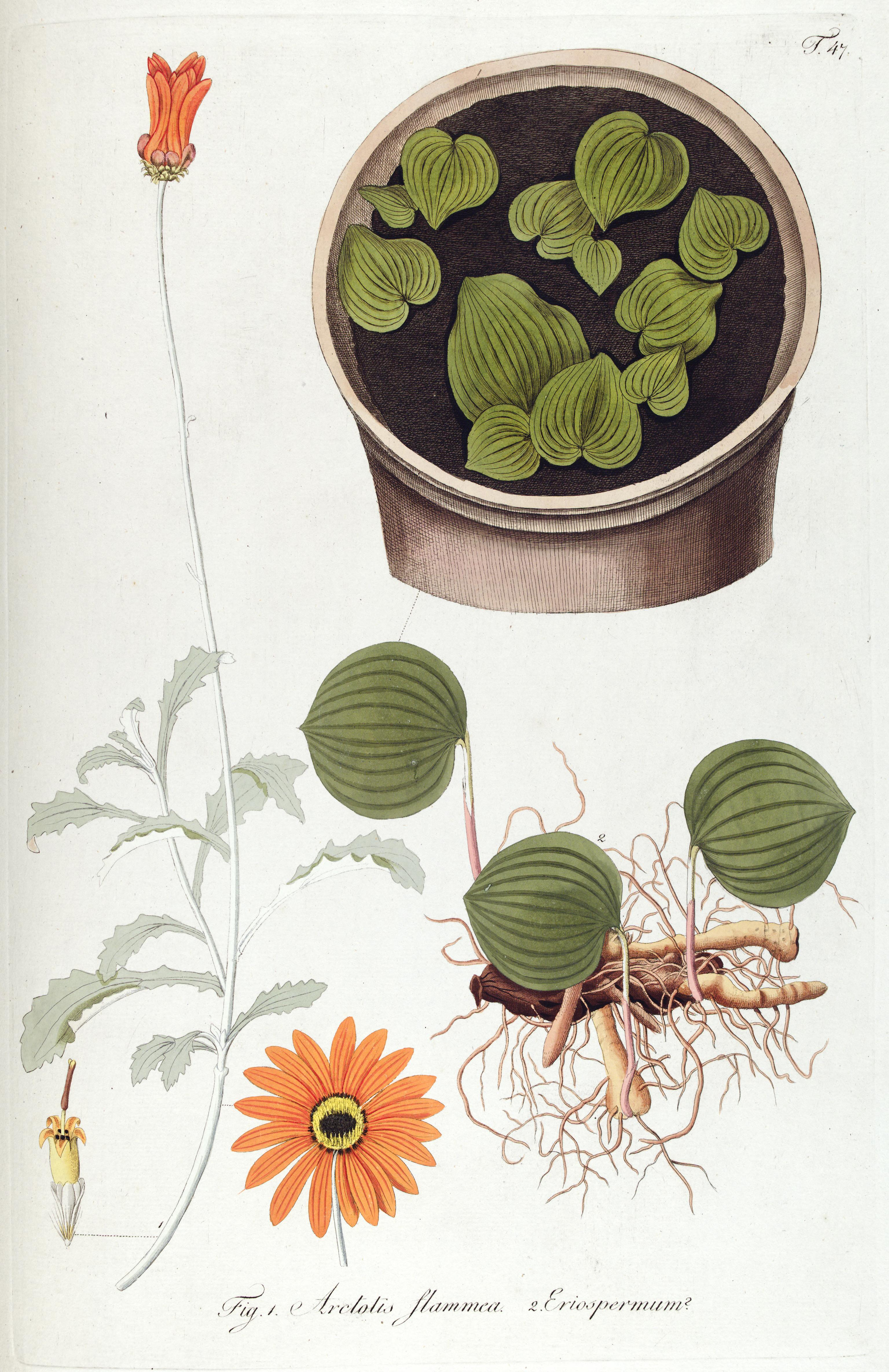

Scientific classification
- Kingdom: Plantae
- Clade: Tracheophytes
- Clade: Angiosperms
- Clade: Monocots
- Order: Asparagales
- Family: Asparagaceae
- Subfamily: Convallarioideae
- Genus: Eriospermum; Jacq. ex Willd.

Synonyms
- Loncodilis Raf.; Phylloglottis Salisb.; Thaumaza Salisb.

= Eriospermum =

Genus of flowering plants

Eriospermum is a genus of tuberous flowering plants. It contains 114 species native to sub-Saharan Africa.

== Name ==
The name "Eriospermum" is from the Greek erion for "wool" and sperma for "seed". In the APG III classification system, the genus is placed in the family Asparagaceae, subfamily Convallarioideae (formerly the family Ruscaceae). It was formerly placed in its own family, Eriospermaceae.

== Species ==
114 species are accepted.

- Eriospermum abyssinicum Baker
- Eriospermum adpressifolium O.Weber
- Eriospermum aequilibre Poelln.
- Eriospermum alcicorne Baker
- Eriospermum algiferum Marloth ex A.V.Duthie
- Eriospermum andongense Welw. ex Baker
- Eriospermum aphyllum Marloth
- Eriospermum appendiculatum A.V.Duthie
- Eriospermum arachnoideum P.L.Perry
- Eriospermum arenosum P.L.Perry
- Eriospermum aribesense P.L.Perry
- Eriospermum aridicola G.Will.
- Eriospermum armianum P.L.Perry
- Eriospermum attenuatum Marloth ex P.L.Perry
- Eriospermum bakerianum Schinz
- Eriospermum bayeri P.L.Perry
- Eriospermum bifidum R.A.Dyer
- Eriospermum bowieanum Baker
- Eriospermum bracteatum Archibald
- Eriospermum brevipes Baker
- Eriospermum breviscapum Marloth ex P.L.Perry
- Eriospermum bruynsii P.L.Perry
- Eriospermum buchubergense Dinter
- Eriospermum calcareum P.L.Perry
- Eriospermum capense (L.) T.M.Salter
- Eriospermum cecilii Baker
- Eriospermum cernuum Baker
- Eriospermum cervicorne Marloth
- Eriospermum ciliatum P.L.Perry
- Eriospermum citrinum P.L.Perry
- Eriospermum coactum P.L.Perry
- Eriospermum cooperi Baker
- Eriospermum cordiforme T.M.Salter
- Eriospermum corymbosum Baker
- Eriospermum crispum P.L.Perry
- Eriospermum currorii (Baker) Baker
- Eriospermum descendens Marloth ex P.L.Perry
- Eriospermum deserticola Marloth ex P.L.Perry
- Eriospermum dielsianum Schltr. ex Poelln.
- Eriospermum dissitiflorum Schltr.
- Eriospermum dregei Schönland
- Eriospermum dyeri Marloth ex Archibald
- Eriospermum erinum P.L.Perry
- Eriospermum eriophorum Marloth ex P.L.Perry
- Eriospermum ernstii P.L.Perry
- Eriospermum exigium P.L.Perry
- Eriospermum exile P.L.Perry
- Eriospermum filicaule Marloth ex P.L.Perry
- Eriospermum flabellatum Marloth ex P.L.Perry
- Eriospermum flavum P.L.Perry
- Eriospermum flexum P.L.Perry
- Eriospermum flexuosum Welw. ex Baker
- Eriospermum folioliferum Andrews
- Eriospermum fragile P.L.Perry
- Eriospermum glaciale P.L.Perry
- Eriospermum graminifolium A.V.Duthie
- Eriospermum graniticola Dinter ex Poelln.
- Eriospermum halenbergense Dinter
- Eriospermum inconspicuum P.L.Perry
- Eriospermum juttae Dinter
- Eriospermum kiboense K.Krause
- Eriospermum kirkii Baker
- Eriospermum krauseanum Poelln.
- Eriospermum lanceifolium Jacq. ex Willd.
- Eriospermum lanimarginatum Marloth ex P.L.Perry
- Eriospermum lanuginosum Jacq.
- Eriospermum lavranosii P.L.Perry
- Eriospermum laxiracemosum P.L.Perry
- Eriospermum macgregoriorum P.L.Perry
- Eriospermum mackenii (Hook.f.) Baker
- Eriospermum marginatum Marloth ex P.L.Perry
- Eriospermum minutiflorum Marloth ex P.L.Perry
- Eriospermum minutipustulatum P.L.Perry
- Eriospermum multifidum Marloth
- Eriospermum namaquanum Marloth ex P.L.Perry
- Eriospermum nanum Marloth
- Eriospermum occultum Archibald
- Eriospermum ophioglossoides Welw. ex Baker
- Eriospermum ornithogaloides Baker
- Eriospermum orthophyllum (Archibald) P.L.Perry
- Eriospermum paludosum Baker
- Eriospermum papilliferum A.V.Duthie
- Eriospermum paradoxum (Jacq.) Ker Gawl.
- Eriospermum parvifolium Jacq. ex Willd.
- Eriospermum parvulum P.L.Perry
- Eriospermum patentiflorum Schltr.
- Eriospermum porphyrium Archibald
- Eriospermum porphyrovalve Baker
- Eriospermum proliferum Baker
- Eriospermum pubescens Jacq.
- Eriospermum pumilum T.M.Salter
- Eriospermum pusillum P.L.Perry
- Eriospermum pustulatum Marloth ex A.V.Duthie
- Eriospermum ramosum P.L.Perry
- Eriospermum ratelpoortianum P.L.Perry
- Eriospermum rhizomatum P.L.Perry
- Eriospermum roseum Schinz
- Eriospermum sabulosum P.L.Perry
- Eriospermum schinzii Conrath ex Baker
- Eriospermum schlechteri Baker
- Eriospermum spirale (L.) Bergius ex Schult. & Schult.f.
- Eriospermum stenophyllum Welw. ex Baker
- Eriospermum strachaniae van Jaarsv.
- Eriospermum subincanum P.L.Perry
- Eriospermum subtile P.L.Perry
- Eriospermum titanopsoides P.L.Perry
- Eriospermum triphyllum Baker
- Eriospermum tuberculatum P.L.Perry
- Eriospermum undulatum P.L.Perry
- Eriospermum vermiforme Marloth ex P.L.Perry
- Eriospermum villosum Baker
- Eriospermum viscosum Marloth ex P.L.Perry
- Eriospermum volkmanniae Dinter
- Eriospermum zeyheri R.A.Dyer

== Gallery ==
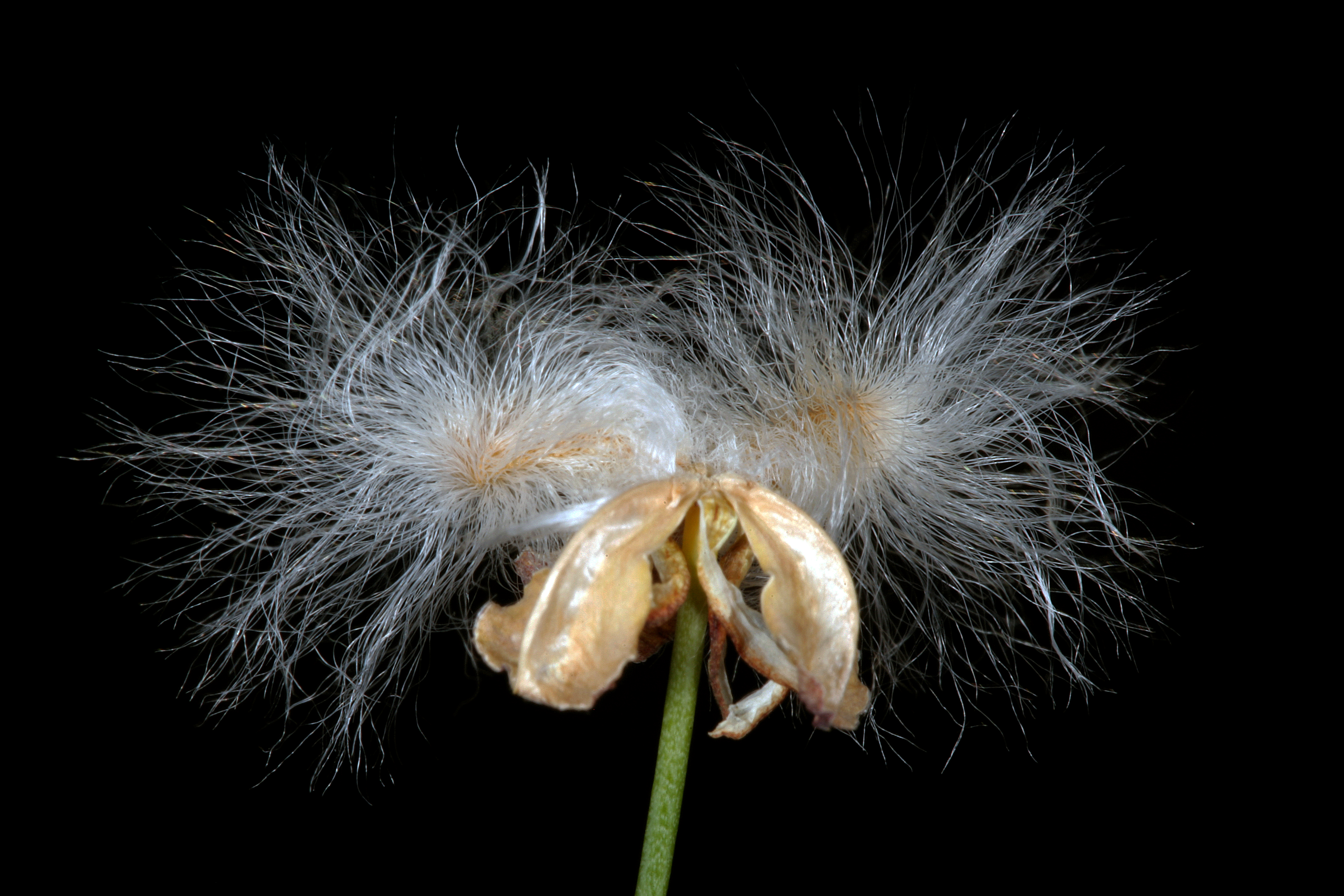
Eriospermum abyssinicum. The genus name "Eriospermum" means "wool-seeds".

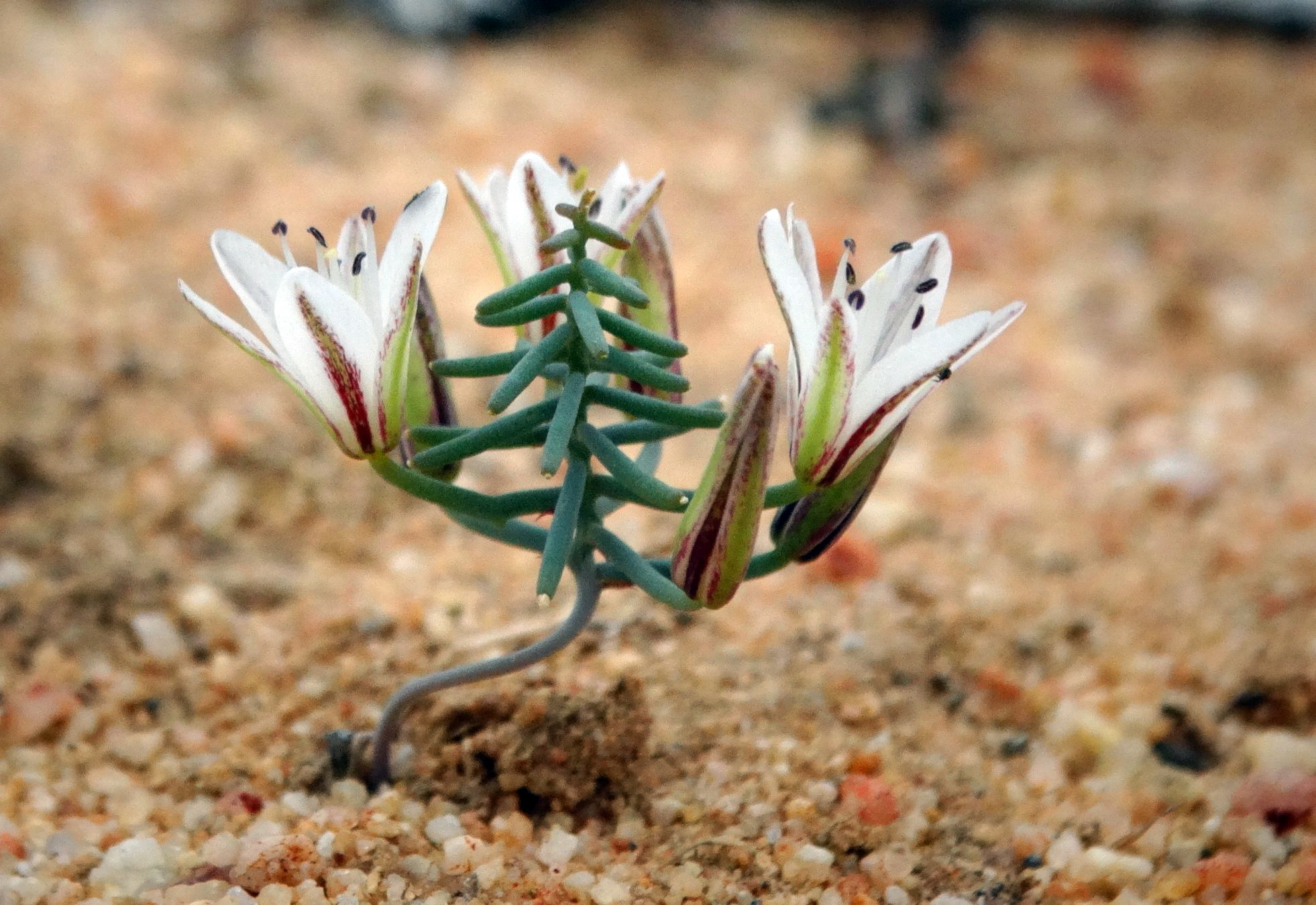
Eriospermum aphyllum

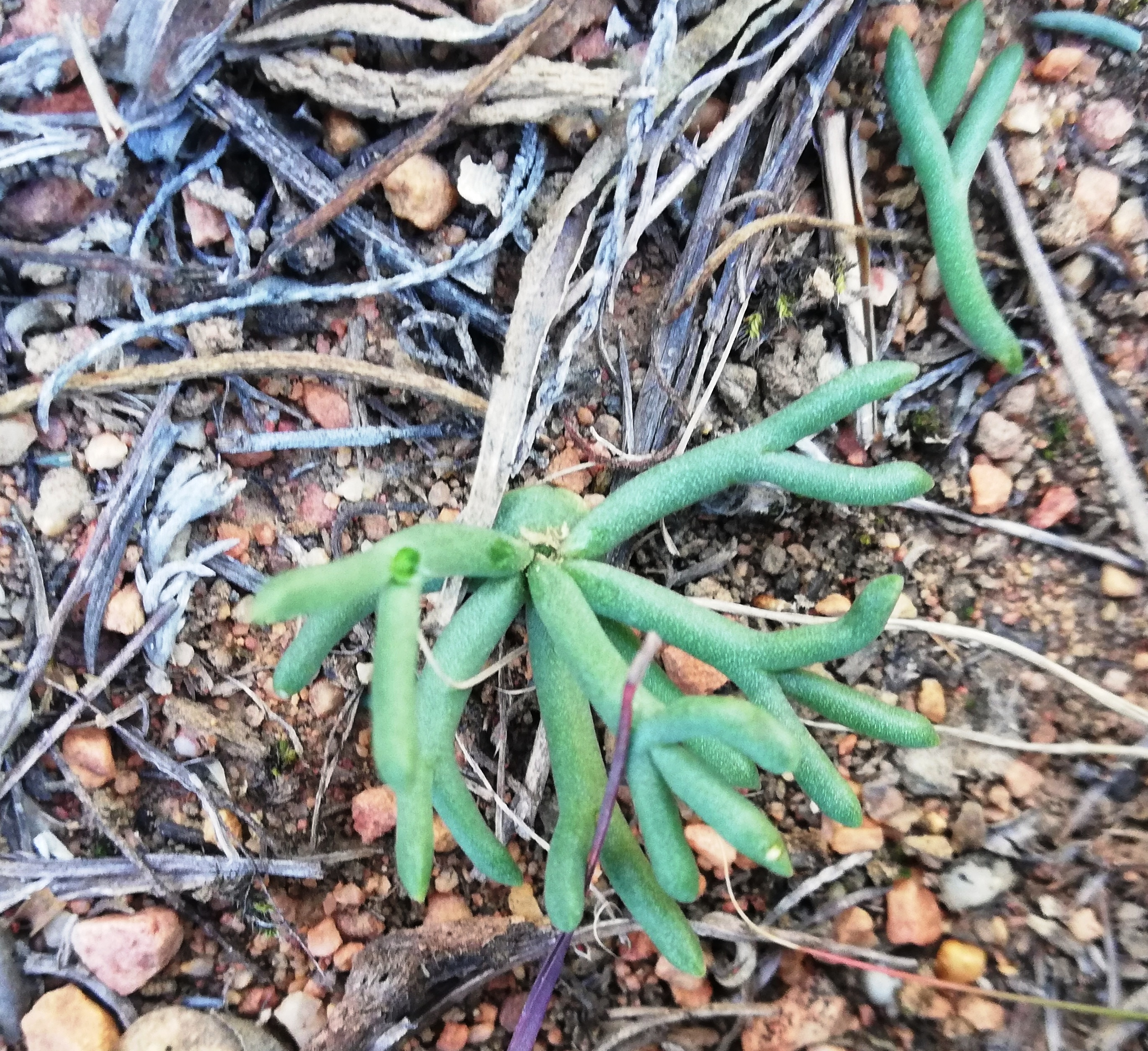
Eriospermum bowieanum

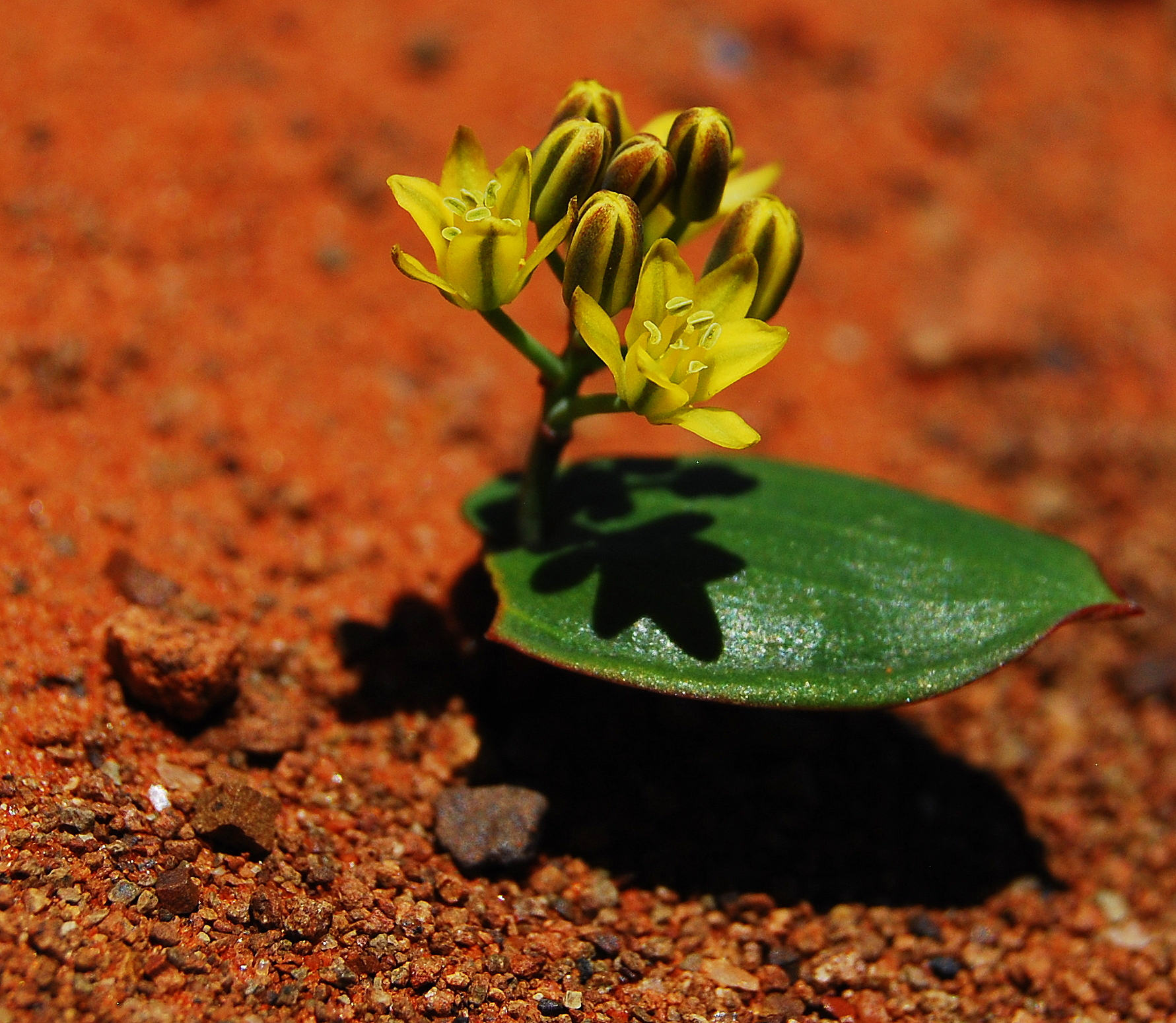
Eriospermum corymbosum

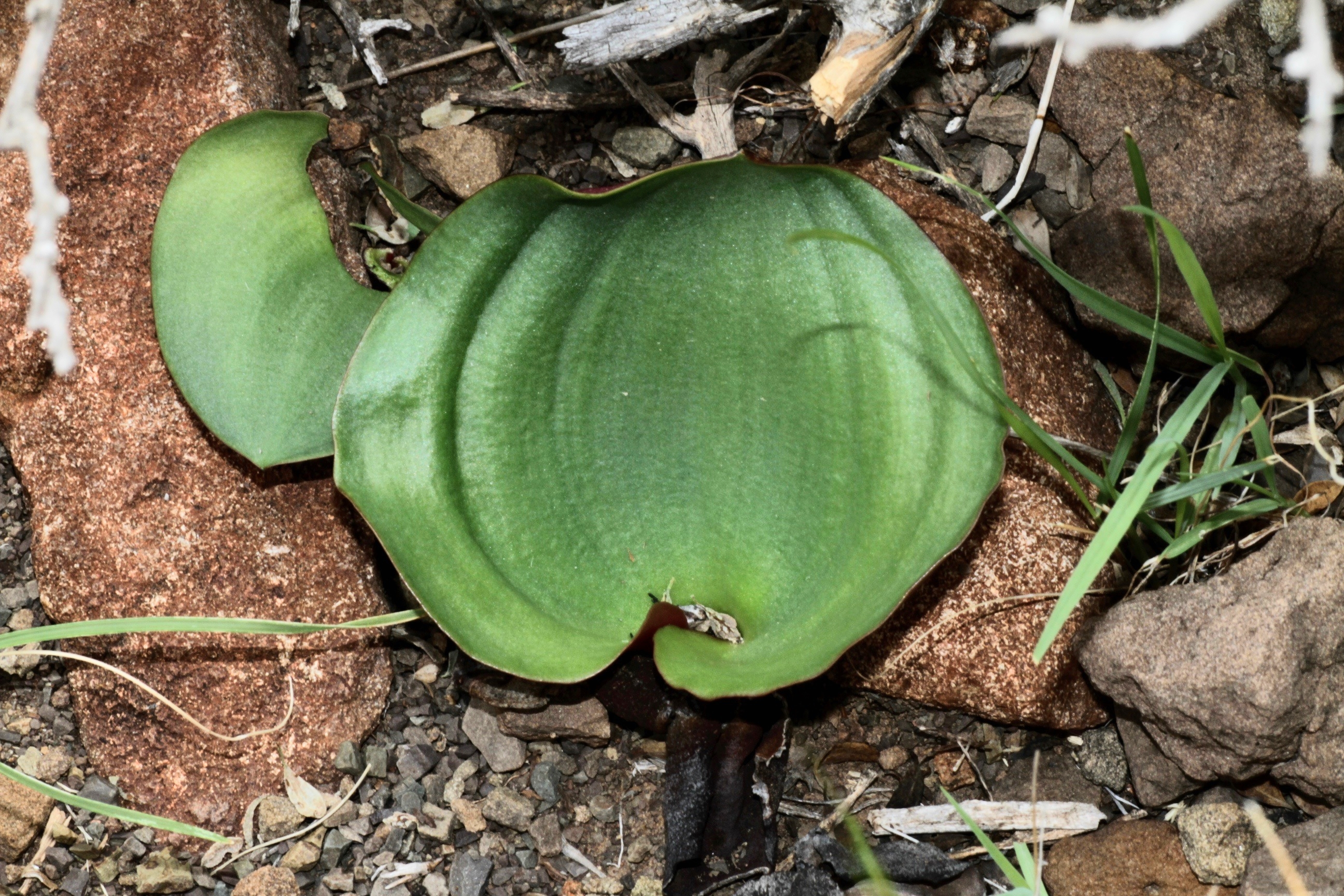
Eriospermum capense

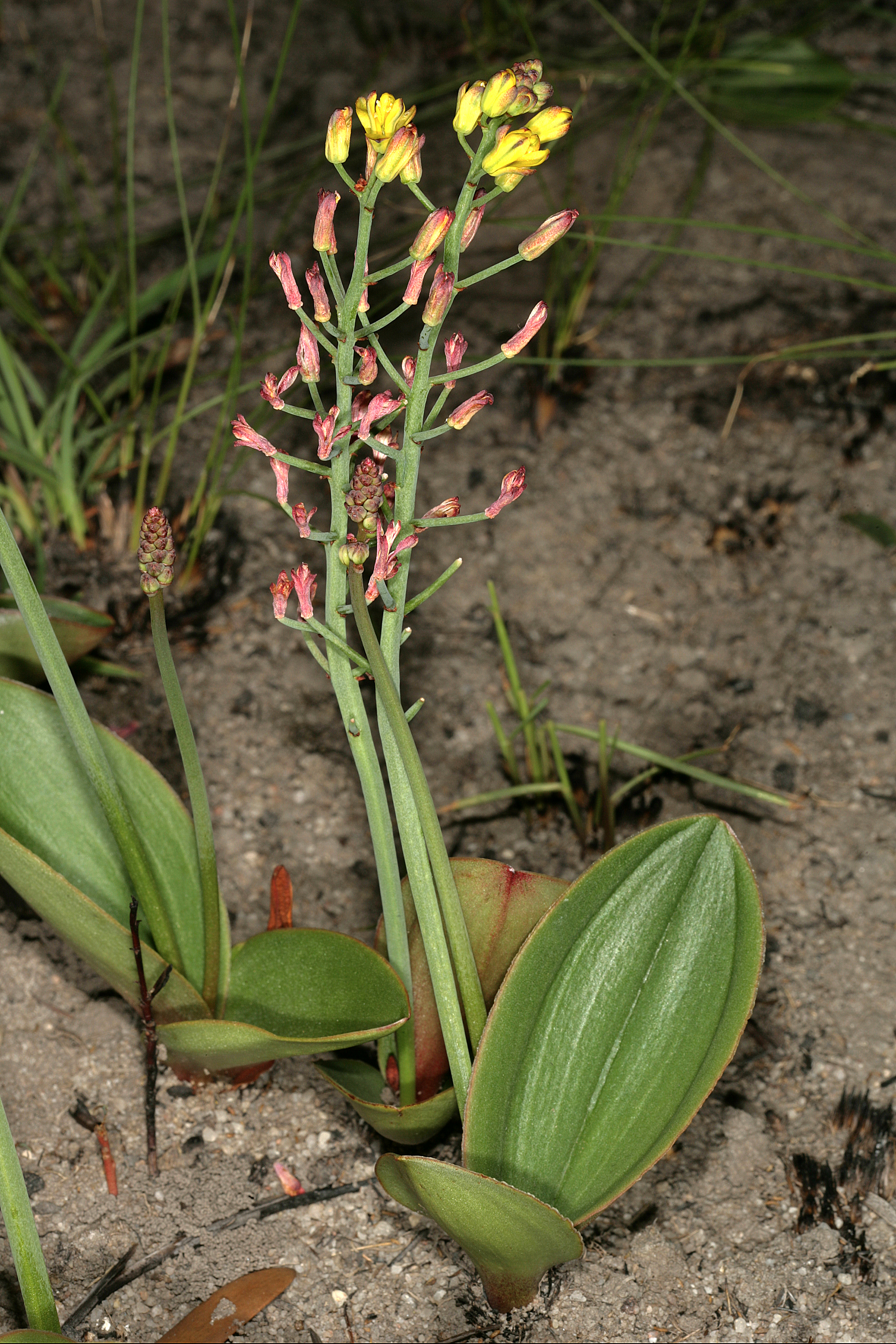
Eriospermum mackenii

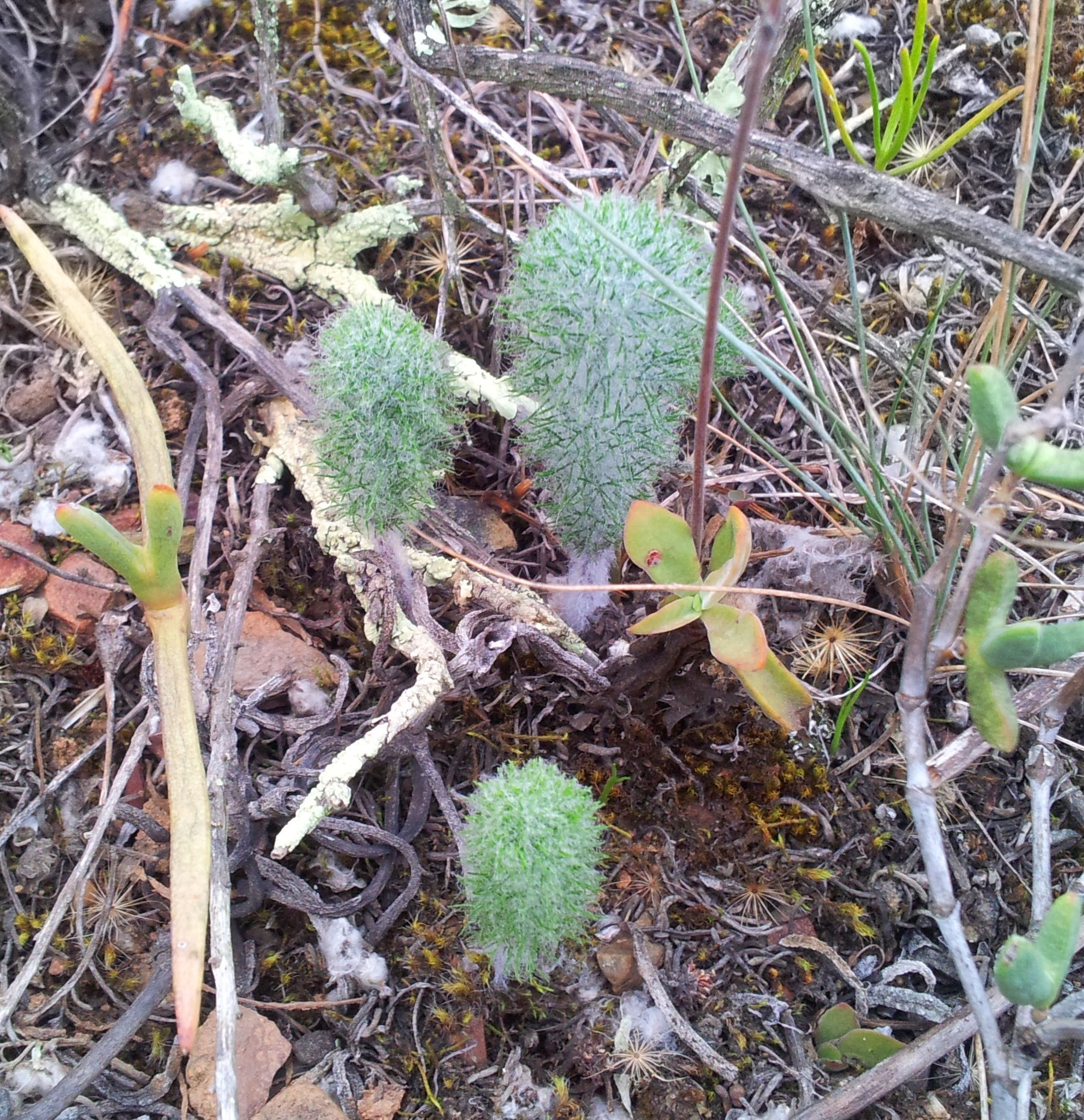
Eriospermum paradoxum

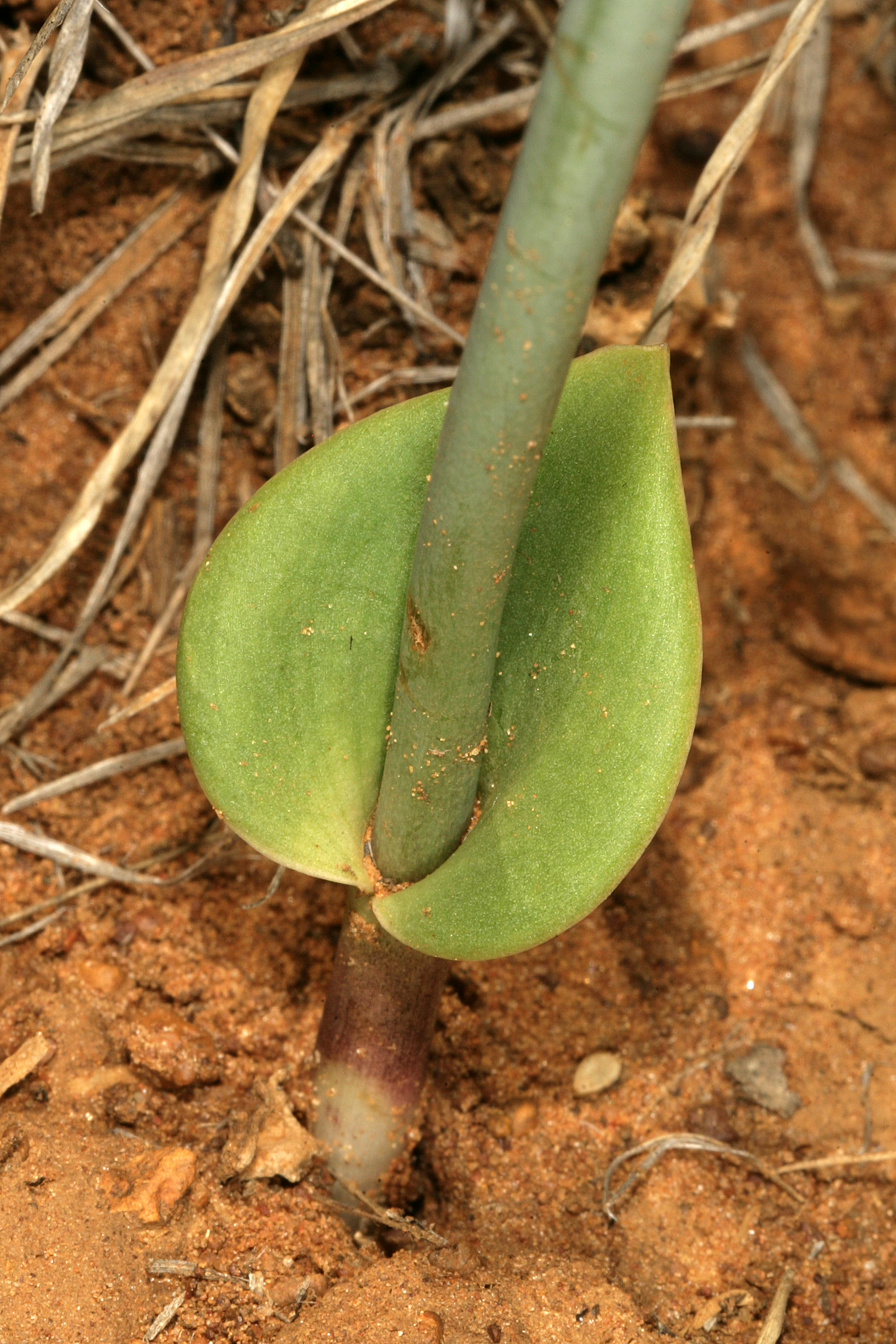
Eriospermum porphyrium
