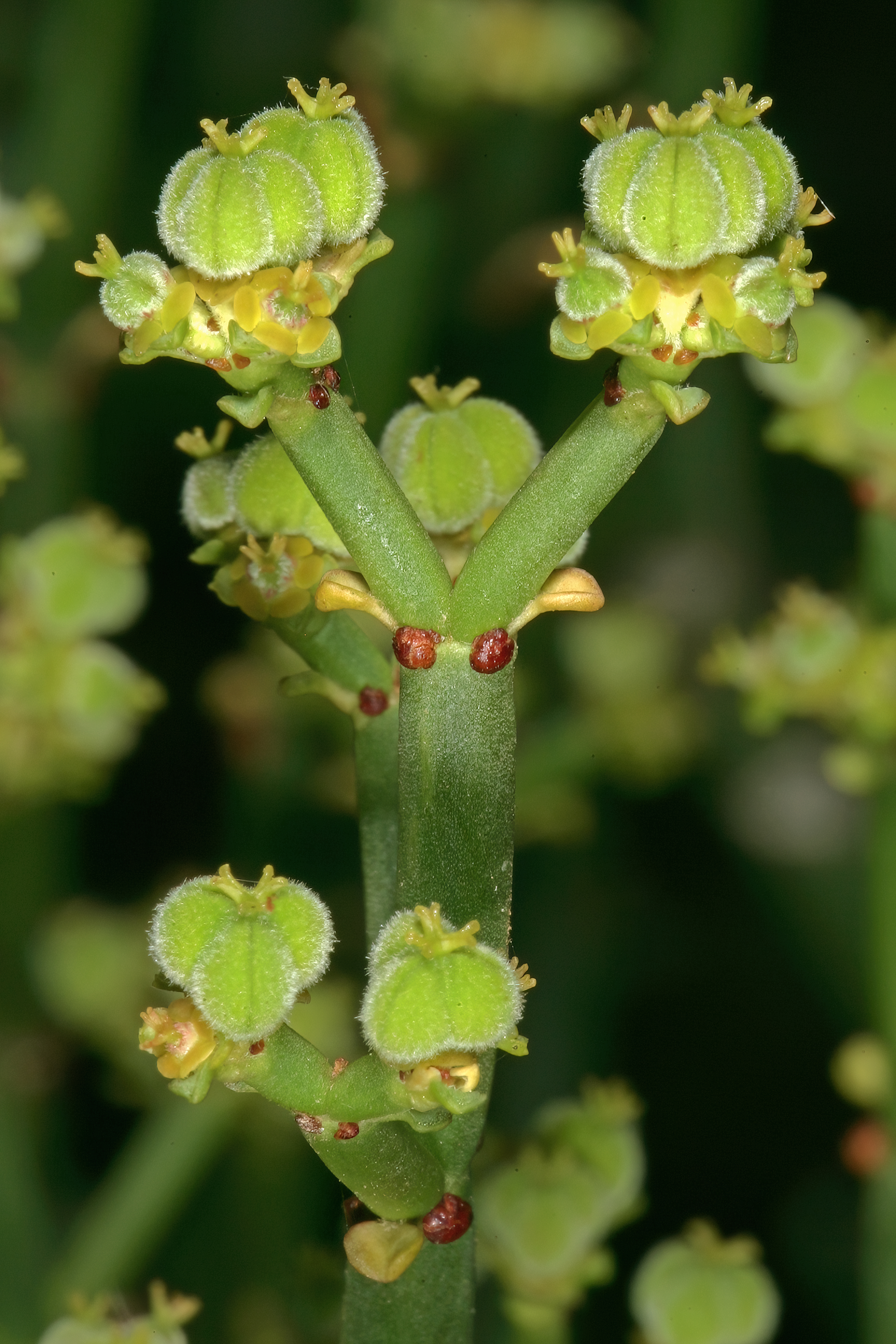

Scientific classification
- Kingdom: Plantae
- Clade: Tracheophytes
- Clade: Angiosperms
- Clade: Eudicots
- Clade: Rosids
- Order: Malpighiales
- Family: Euphorbiaceae
- Genus: Euphorbia
- Species: E. burmanni

Binomial name
- Euphorbia burmanni E.Mey. ex Boiss.

Synonyms
- List: Arthrothamnus bergii; Arthrothamnus burmanni; Euphorbia biglandulosa; Euphorbia corymbosa; Euphorbia karroensis; Euphorbia macella; Tirucalia burmanni; Tirucalia corymbosa; Tirucalia karrooensis; Tirucalia macella

= Euphorbia burmanni =

Plant species in the spurge family

Euphorbia burmanni is a species of Euphorbia indigenous to Namibia and South Africa, where it is widespread in sandy soils, extending southwards to the Cape Peninsula and as far east as Grahamstown.

== Description ==
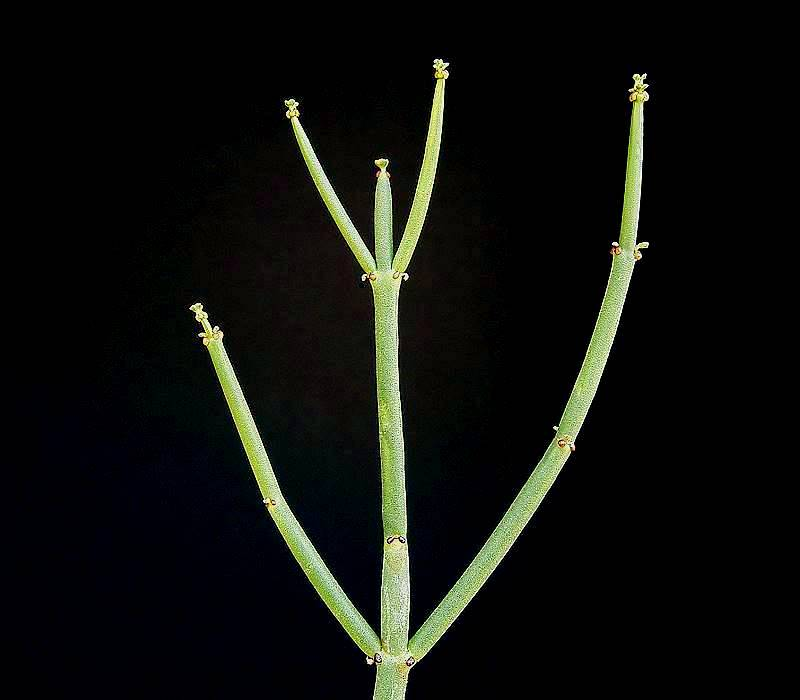
Euphorbia burmanii in cultivation

The stems of this medium-sized (30–70 cm tall), densely branched shrub are thin, segmented, dichotomous, and erect or spreading.

Each node, along the segmented branches, is marked with a pair of large, dark, reddish stipular glands.

It produces large numbers of small, bright yellow flowers.

=== Related species ===
This species is part of a group of closely related "stick euphorbias" including Euphorbia rhombifolia and Euphorbia tenax, which are widespread across southern Africa.

In habitat it also often grows together with the more distantly related species Euphorbia mauritanica.
