= Robertson Karoo =

Semi-arid vegetation type of the Succulent Karoo of South Africa

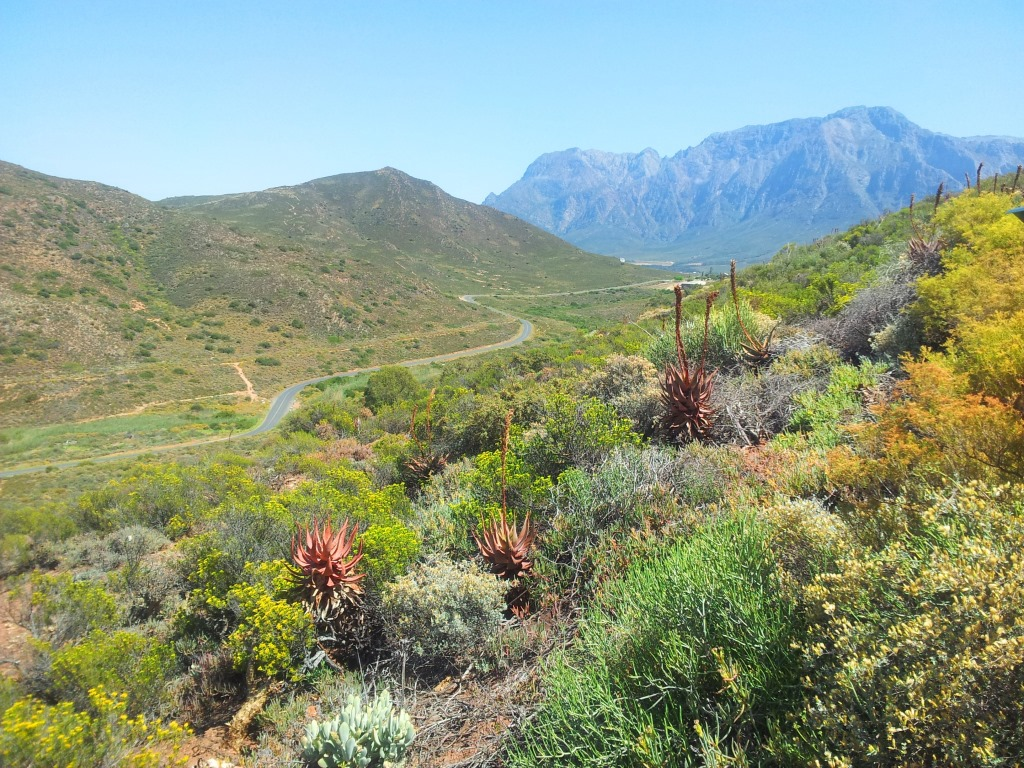
Typical Robertson Karoo vegetation in the hills above Karoo Desert National Botanical Garden, Worcester

Robertson Karoo is a semi-arid vegetation type, restricted to sections of the Breede River Valley, Western Cape Province, South Africa. It is a subtype of Succulent Karoo (geographically an extension of the "Little Karoo") and is characterised by the dominance of succulent plant species, and by several endemic plants and animals.

== Location and extent ==
This vegetation type occurs in several large patches within the Breede River Valley, in the Western Cape Province of South Africa. It occurs in the area between Worcester in the north-west, Ashton in the east, and the Riviersonderend mountains in the south.

== Landscape and climate ==
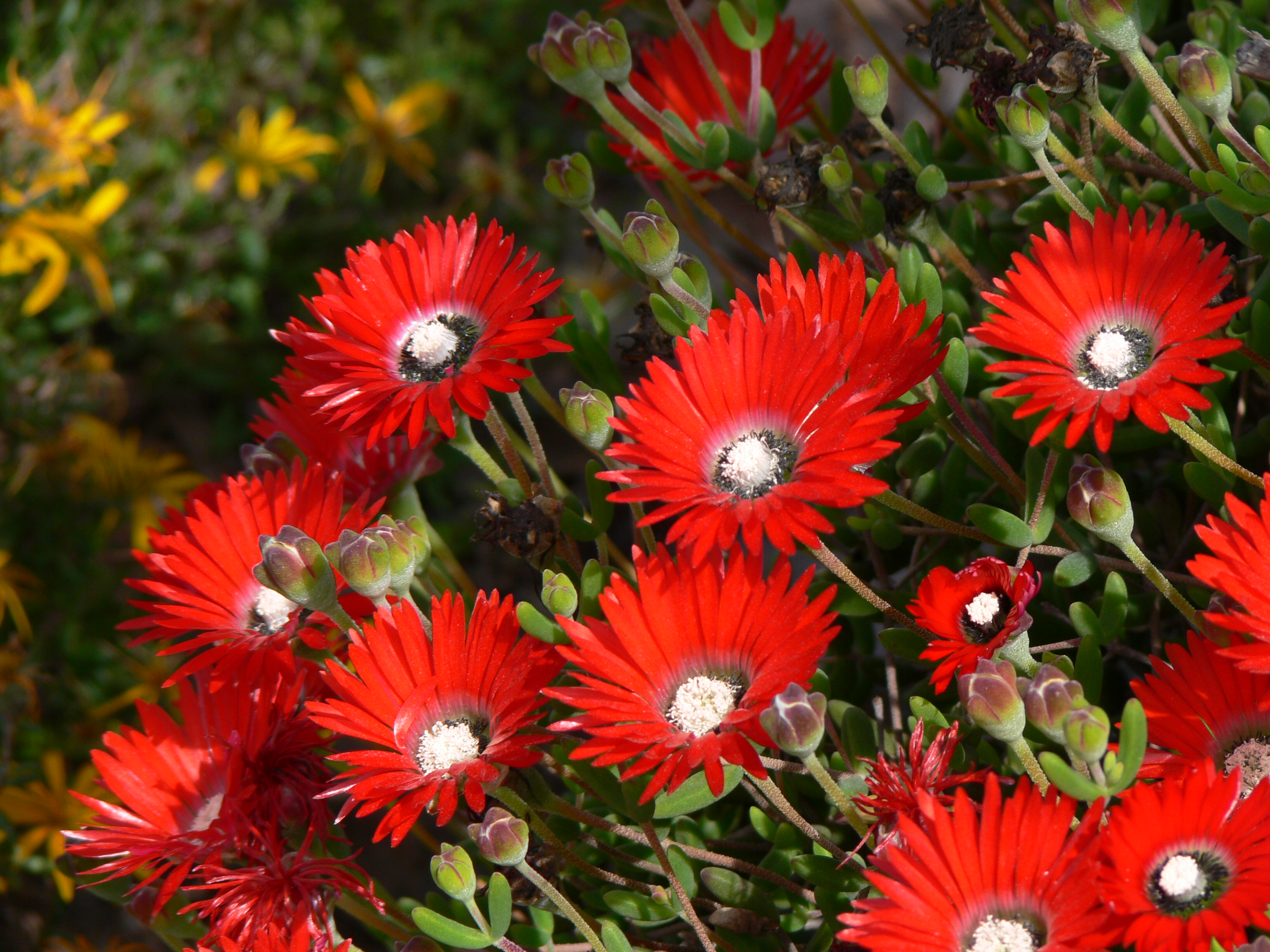
Drosanthemum spp.

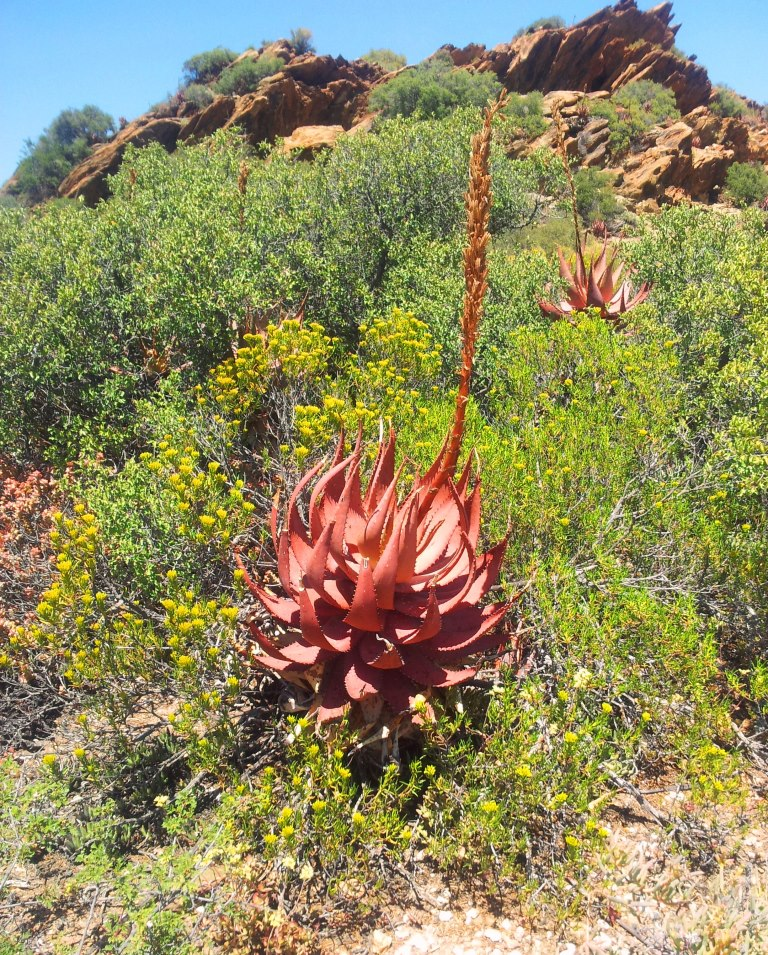
Aloe microstigma

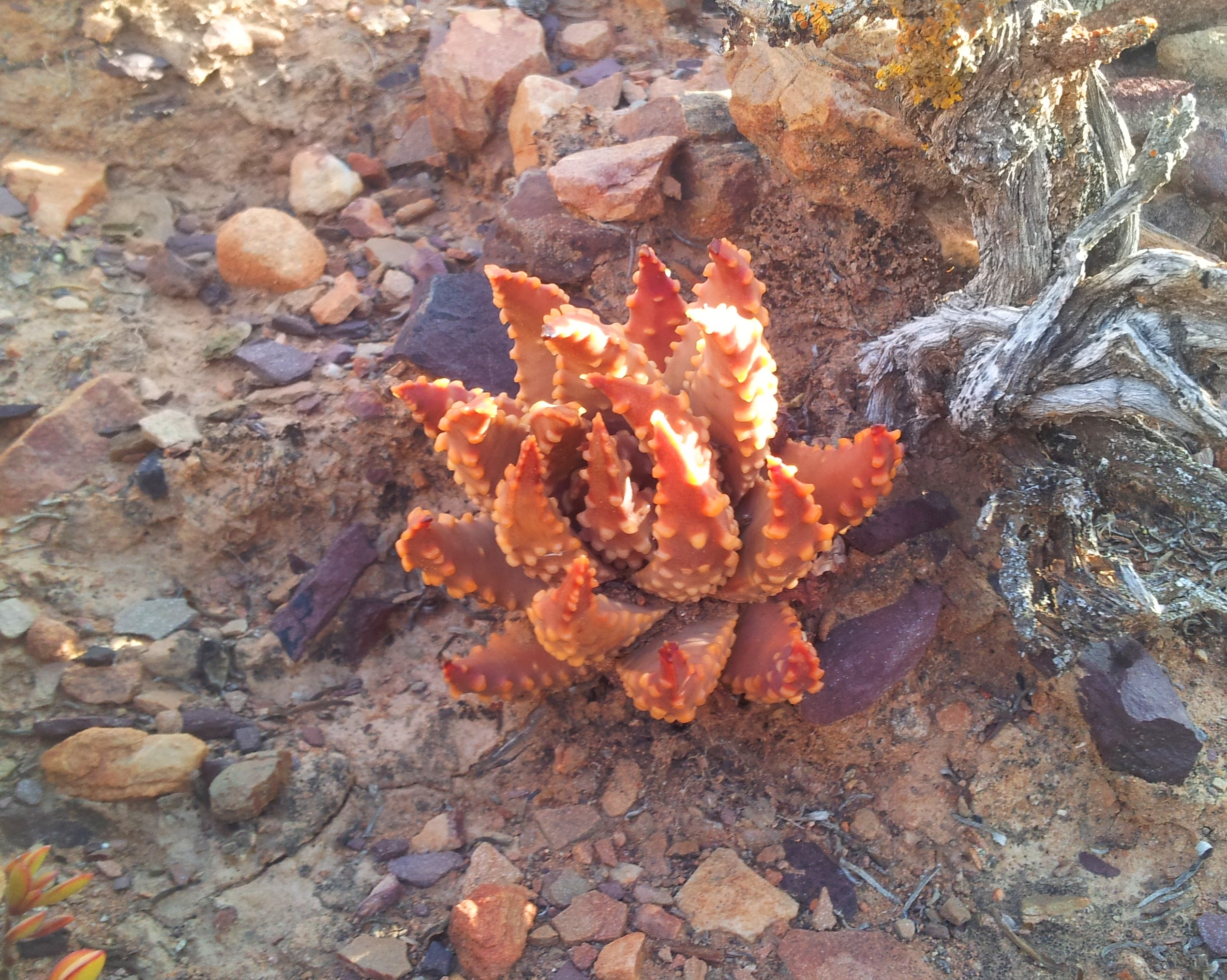
Small Haworthia pumila plant

Robertson Karoo typically consists of low hills and flats covered in small succulent vegetation, usually growing on rocky shale-based soils. The climate is semi-arid due to the region lying in the rainshadow of the large mountain ranges to the south-west, but the rainfall does tend to occur mainly in winter.

This vegetation type has a large number of endemic species and several endemic genera.

== Some associated plant species ==
- Aloe microstigma
- Haworthia pumila
- Haworthia reticulata
- Cotyledon orbiculata
- Gasteria disticha
- Astroloba rubriflora
- Conophytum ficiforme
- Euphorbia burmanni
- Euphorbia mauritanica var. corallothamnus (dominant on the typical raised "heuweltjies")
- Crassula rupestris
- Ruschia caroli
- Euclea undulata
- Helichrysum hamulosum
- Stapelia paniculata subsp. scitula
- Eriocephalus africanus
- Eriospermum bayeri
- Eriospermum bowieanum
- Stayneria spp. (endemic genus)
- Brianhuntleya spp. (endemic genus)
- Drosanthemum spp.
- Pelargonium spp.

== Some associated animal species ==
- Aloeides lutescens (endemic)
- Bradypodion gutturale (endemic)

== See also ==
- Karoo
- Karoo Desert National Botanical Garden
