= Karoo Desert National Botanical Garden =

Botanical garden focused on succulents and other plants of arid regions

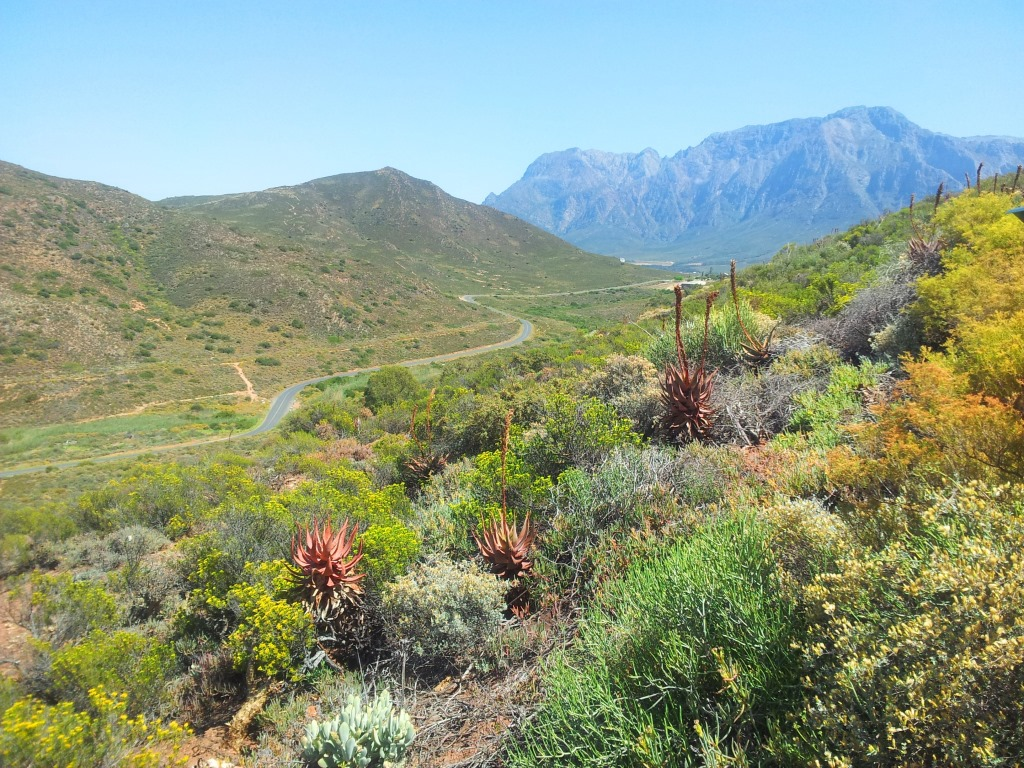
- Type: Botanical garden
- Location: Worcester, South Africa
- Coordinates: 33°36′58″S 19°27′03″E
- Established: 1921; 105 years ago - Logan Memorial Garden; 15 August 1945; 80 years ago - Karoo National Botanical Garden
- Hiking trails: Malmesbury Shale Trail; Grysbokkie Trail; Heuweltjie Trail
- Website: Karoo Desert National Botanical Garden

The Karoo Desert National Botanical Garden is a botanical garden focused on succulents and other plants of arid regions, that lies at the foot of the Hex River Mountains range, in the town of Worcester, South Africa.

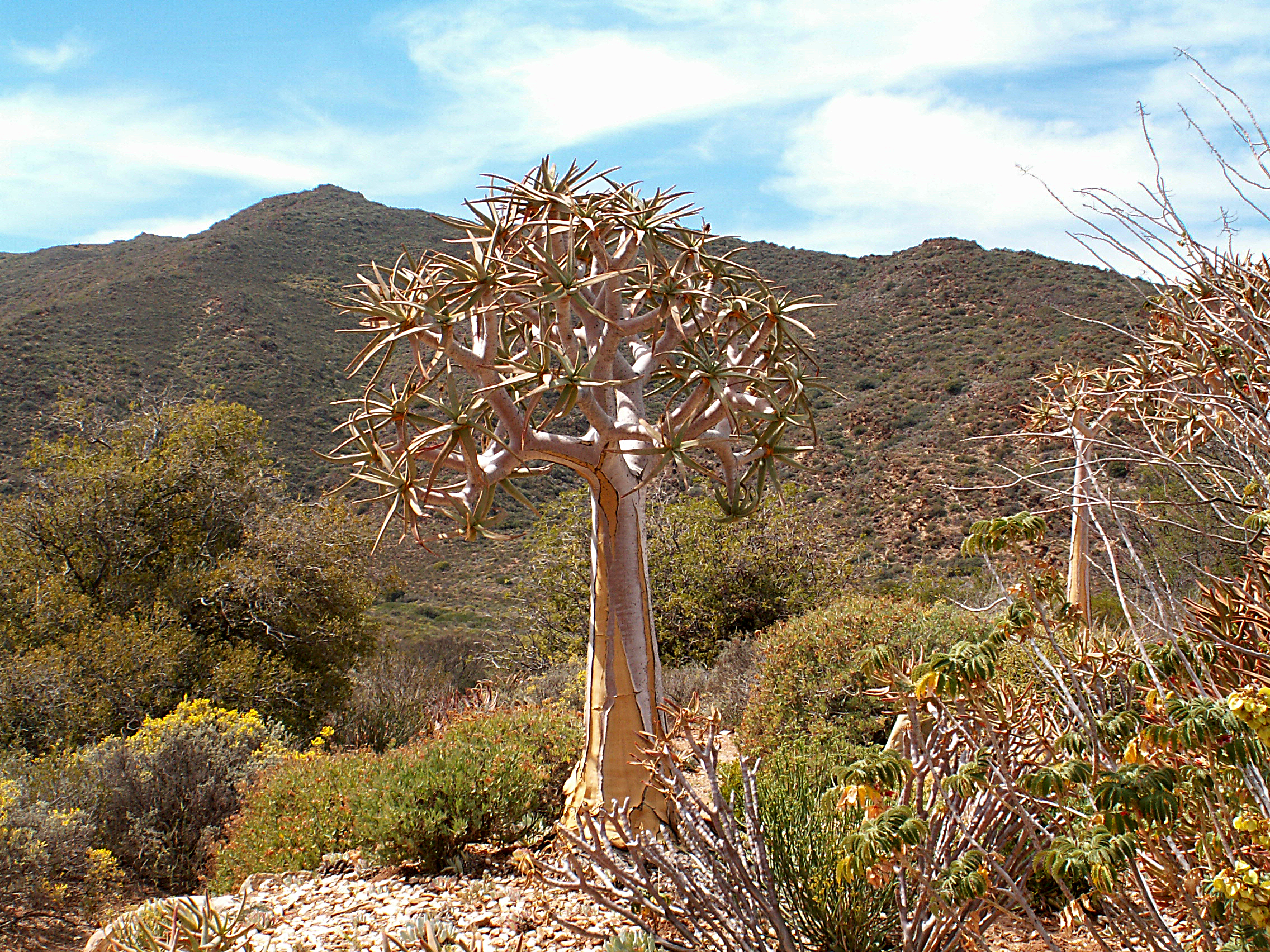
Karoo Desert National Botanical Garden

== History ==
It was originally set up in 1921 near Matjiesfontein further inland. However, in 1945 it was moved to Worcester. It is today one of nine National Botanical Gardens that are run by the South African National Biodiversity Institute (SANBI).

== Layout ==
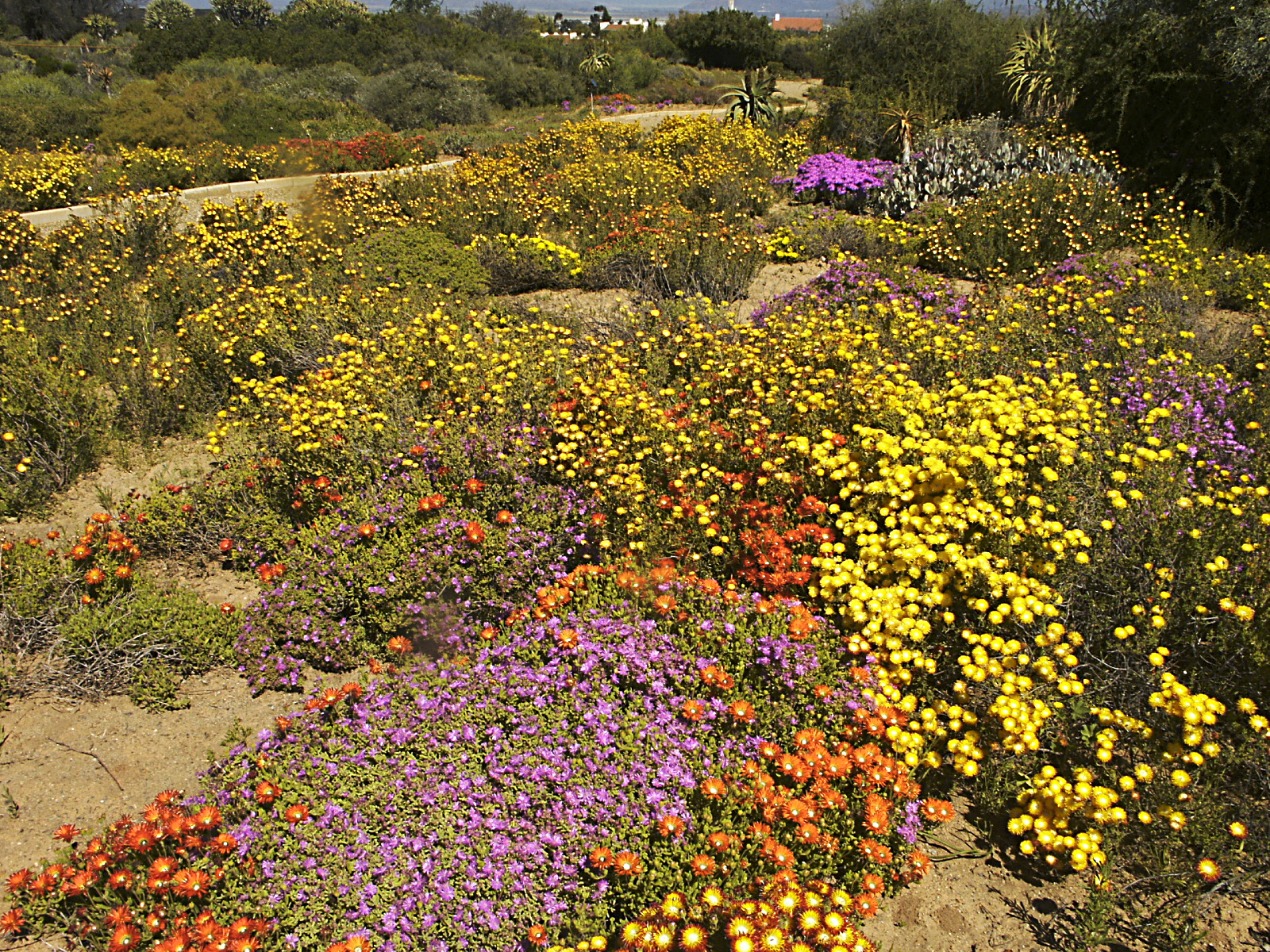
"Vygie" succulents in flower. Spring is generally when the majority of the succulents are in flower and is therefore the most popular time to visit.

The Garden spans an area of 154 hectares (380 acres) with only 11 hectares (27 acres) being cultivated. The remainder preserves the natural vegetation of the area, such as the succulents of the unique Robertson Karoo vegetation type, and patches of the threatened Breede Shale Renosterveld vegetation type.

The cultivated area, with its network of pathways, includes a very large succulent collection. Including the greenhouses it maintains nearly 3,000 species. There are another 400 plant species that are naturally indigenous to the garden's premises.

A range of wild animals also naturally occurs in the garden, including the shrub hare, grey mongoose, three tortoises species (Chersina angulata, Stigmochelys pardalis & Homopus areolatus) and a range of other small mammals, reptiles and amphibians.

== Gallery ==
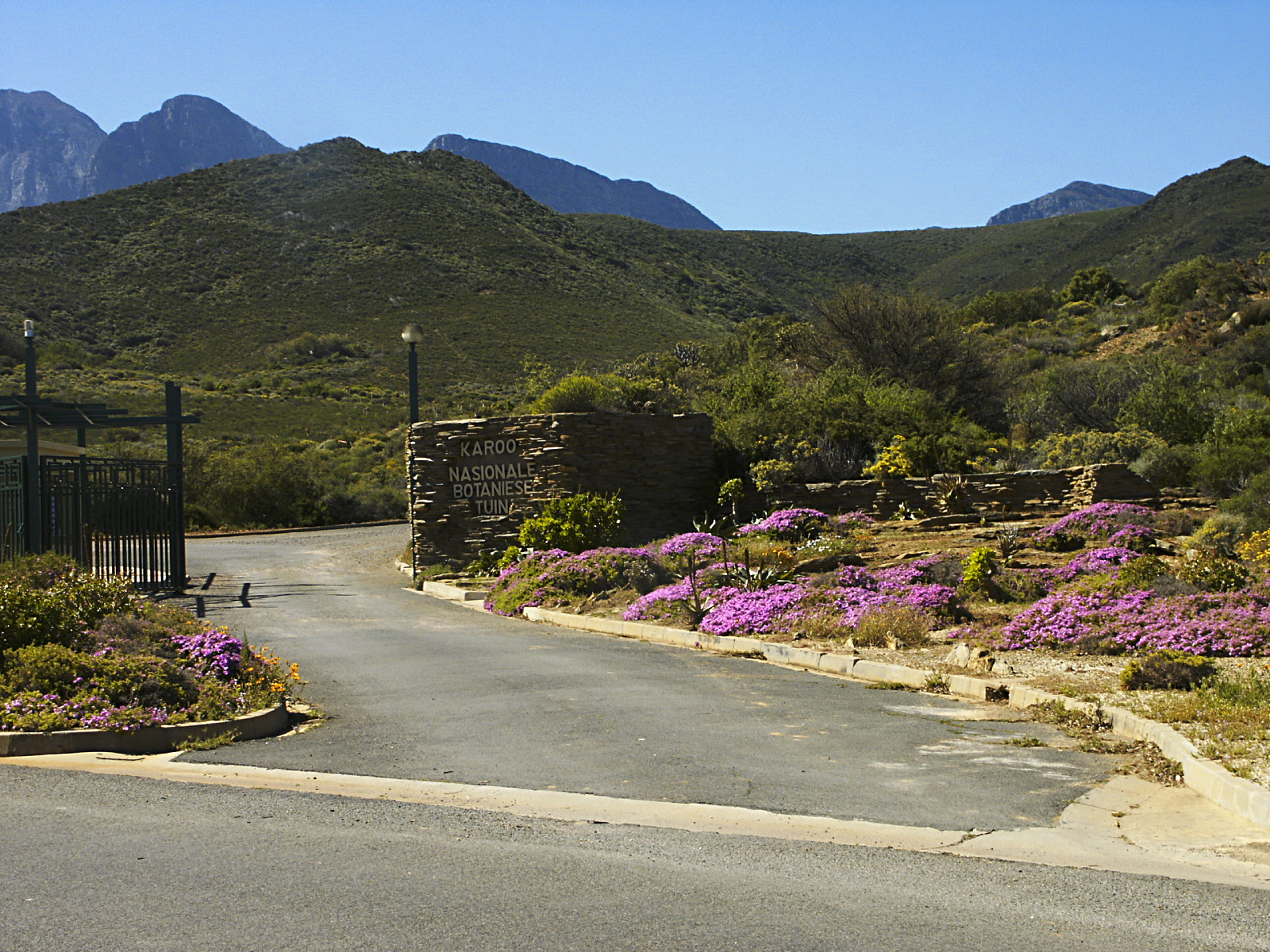

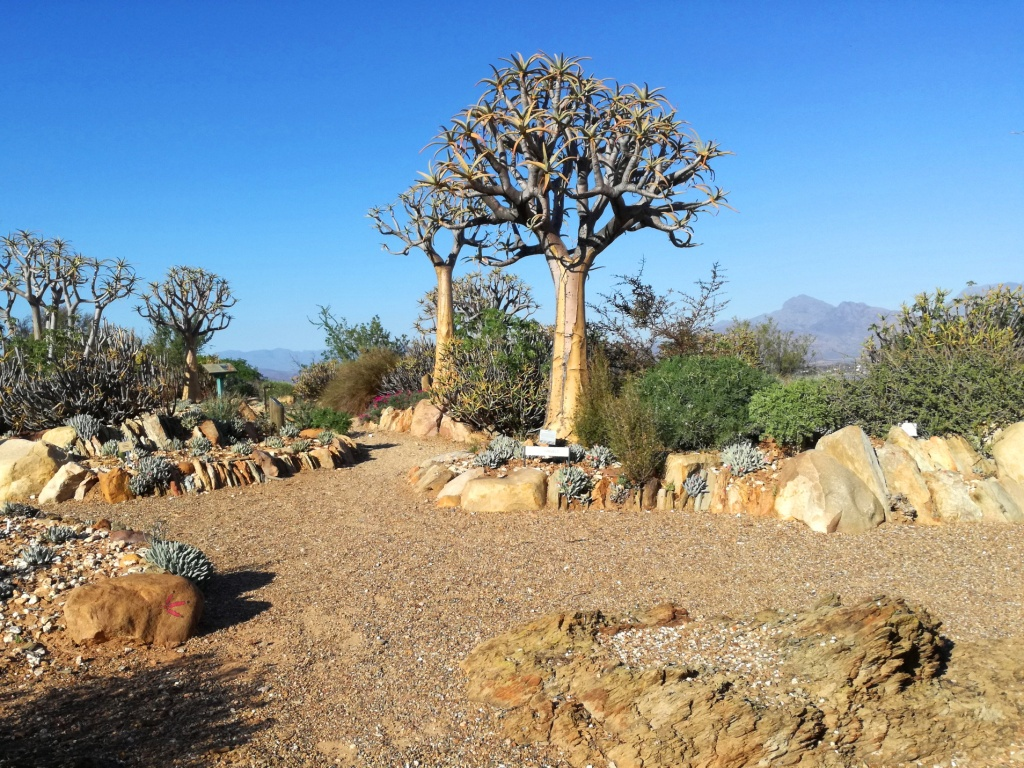

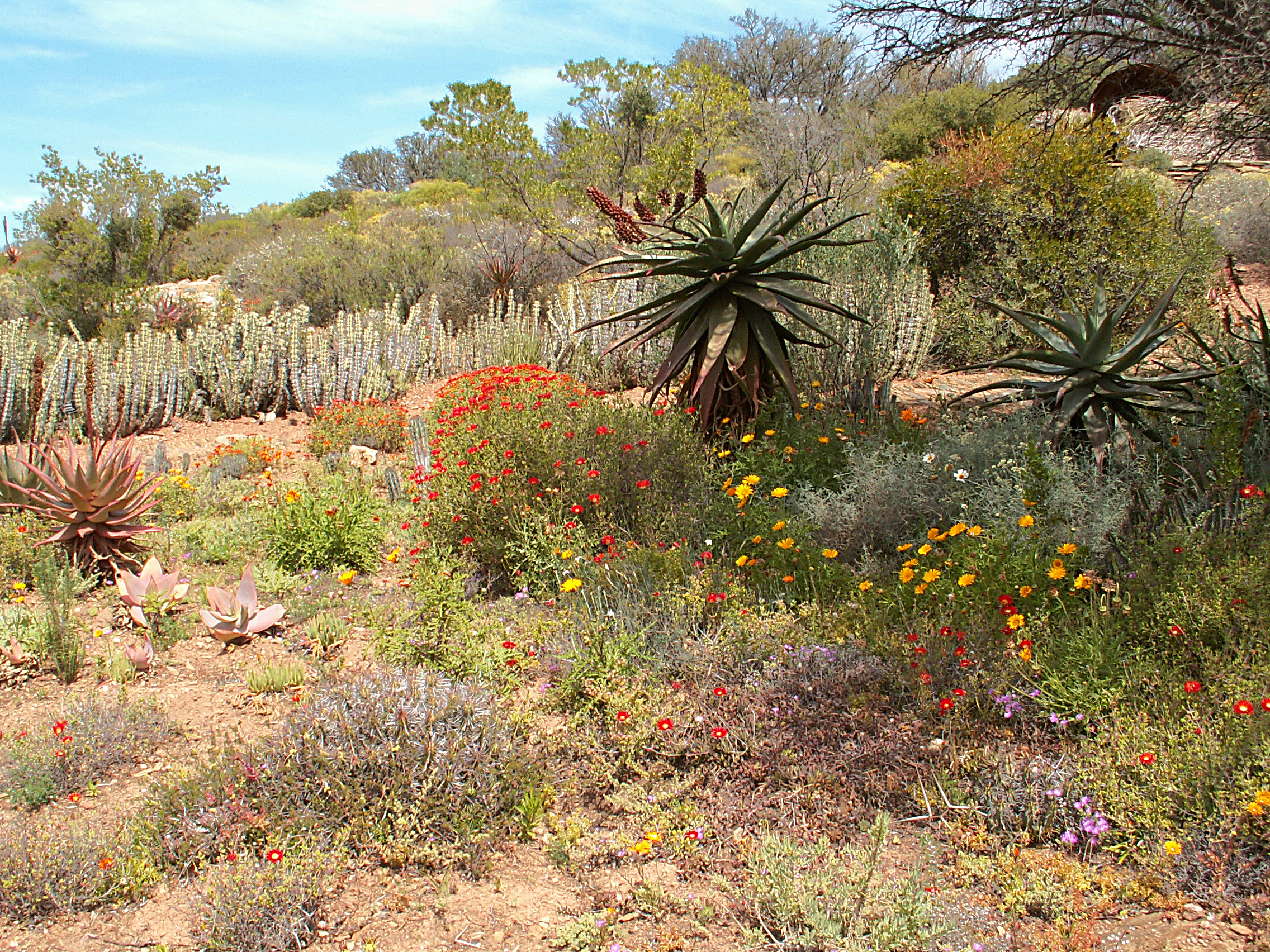

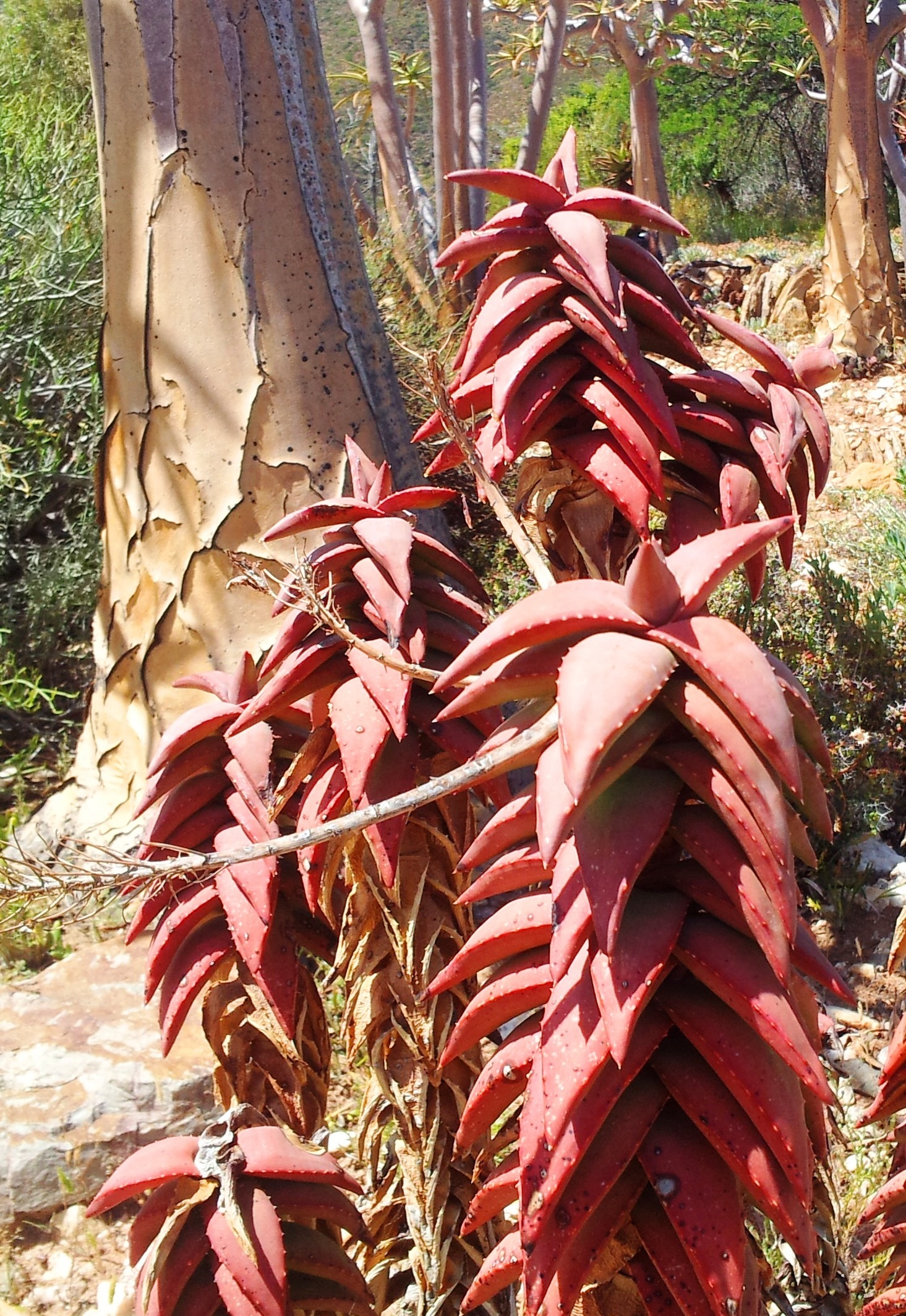

== See also ==
- List of botanical gardens in South Africa
