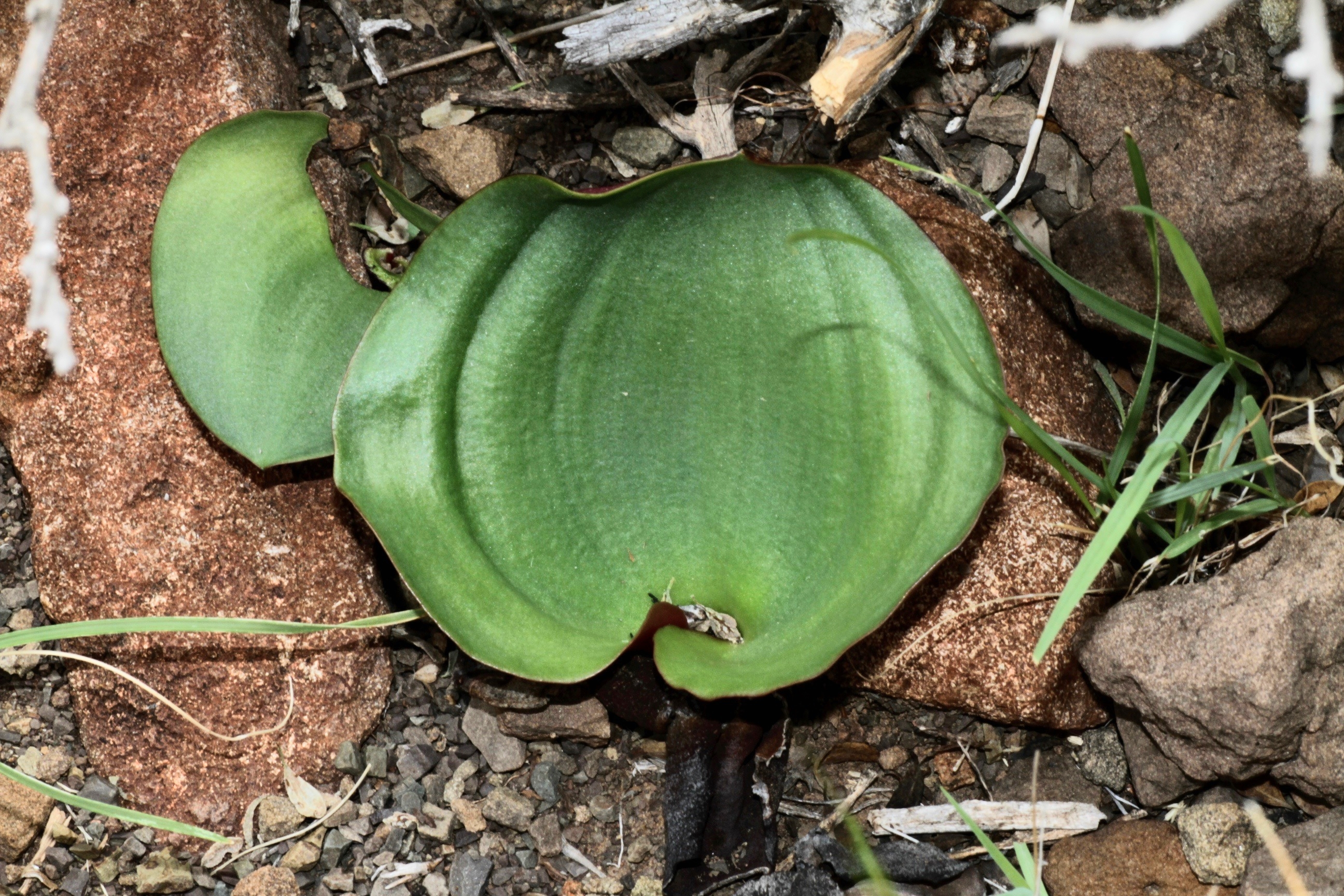

Scientific classification
- Kingdom: Plantae
- Clade: Tracheophytes
- Clade: Angiosperms
- Clade: Monocots
- Order: Asparagales
- Family: Asparagaceae
- Subfamily: Nolinoideae
- Genus: Eriospermum
- Species: E. capense

Binomial name
- Eriospermum capense Perry

= Eriospermum capense =

Species of flowering plant

Eriospermum capense is a species of geophytic plant of the genus Eriospermum, indigenous to the Western Cape Province, South Africa.

== Description ==
The leaf is heart-shaped (7,5 cm long, 6 cm wide), suberect-to-spreading, and appears from April to October (Winter in southern hemisphere). The leaf is dark-green above, and red on its underside. Sometimes the upper side also has reddish ridges. The tuber is irregular-to-pear-shaped, with reddish-purple flesh. This species flowers from November to March.

=== Related species ===
Several related species, such as Eriospermum breviscapum, Eriospermum pubescens and Eriospermum zeyheri, have a similar heart-shaped leaf.

However, the leaf of these species is usually prostrate; while the leaf of E.capense is more erect and spreading. The leaf of E.capense is also distinctly reddish on its underside, and slightly longer (75mm) than that of the other species (60mm) listed above.

There are other specific distinctions. The leaf of Eriospermum zeyheri for example, is a slightly lighter green above, and not reddish below; the leaf is held flat against the ground, and the flowers are also distinct. The leaf of Eriospermum breviscapumis fleshy and a more rounded heart-shape.

== Distribution and habitat ==
Eriospermum capense is widespread and common in the south-western winter-rainfall regions of South Africa.

== Subspecies ==
- Eriospermum capense subspecies capense has a suberect, ovate, grey-green leaf that is usually hairless. This widespread subspecies extends northwards as far as the Namaqualand, and eastwards as far as Grahamstown.
- Eriospermum capense subspecies stoloniferum has scattered hairs on both sides of the prostrate, round, bright-green leaf, which sometimes has a ciliate and wavy margin. This subspecies occurs in clay soils on the Cape Peninsula, Caledon, Malmesbury and Worcester areas, where it is especially common.
