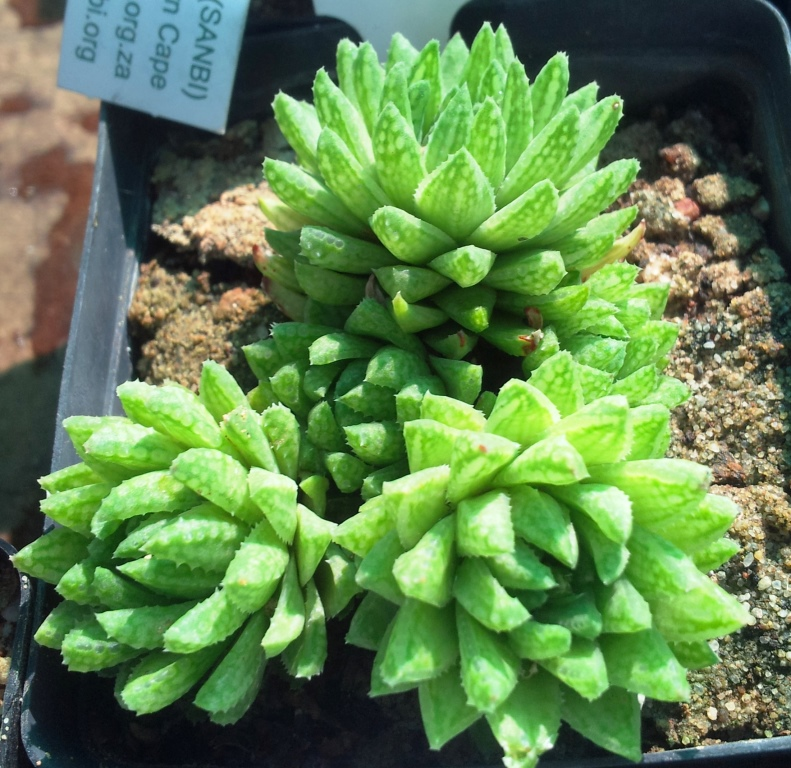
- Haworthia reticulata growing in cultivation in Cape Town

Scientific classification
- Kingdom: Plantae
- Clade: Tracheophytes
- Clade: Angiosperms
- Clade: Monocots
- Order: Asparagales
- Family: Asphodelaceae
- Subfamily: Asphodeloideae
- Genus: Haworthia
- Species: H. reticulata

Binomial name
- Haworthia reticulata (Haw.) Haw.

= Haworthia reticulata =

Species of plant

Haworthia reticulata is a species of succulent plant native to the southwestern Cape Provinces of South Africa. The species has several varieties, including var. hurlingii which is the smallest at up to 1 inch (2.5 cm) wide.

It can generally be distinguished from similar looking species with pale, green foliage like Haworthia cymbiformis or Haworthia herbacea by the fact that its leaves are flat to convex in shape, though due to the various ecotypes it is often difficult to tell them apart based on leaf morphology alone.

== Varieties ==
- Haworthia reticulata var. reticulata
- Haworthia reticulata var. attenuata M.B.Bayer
- Haworthia reticulata var. hurlingii (Poelln.) M.B.Bayer
- Haworthia reticulata var. subregularis (Baker) M.B.Bayer
