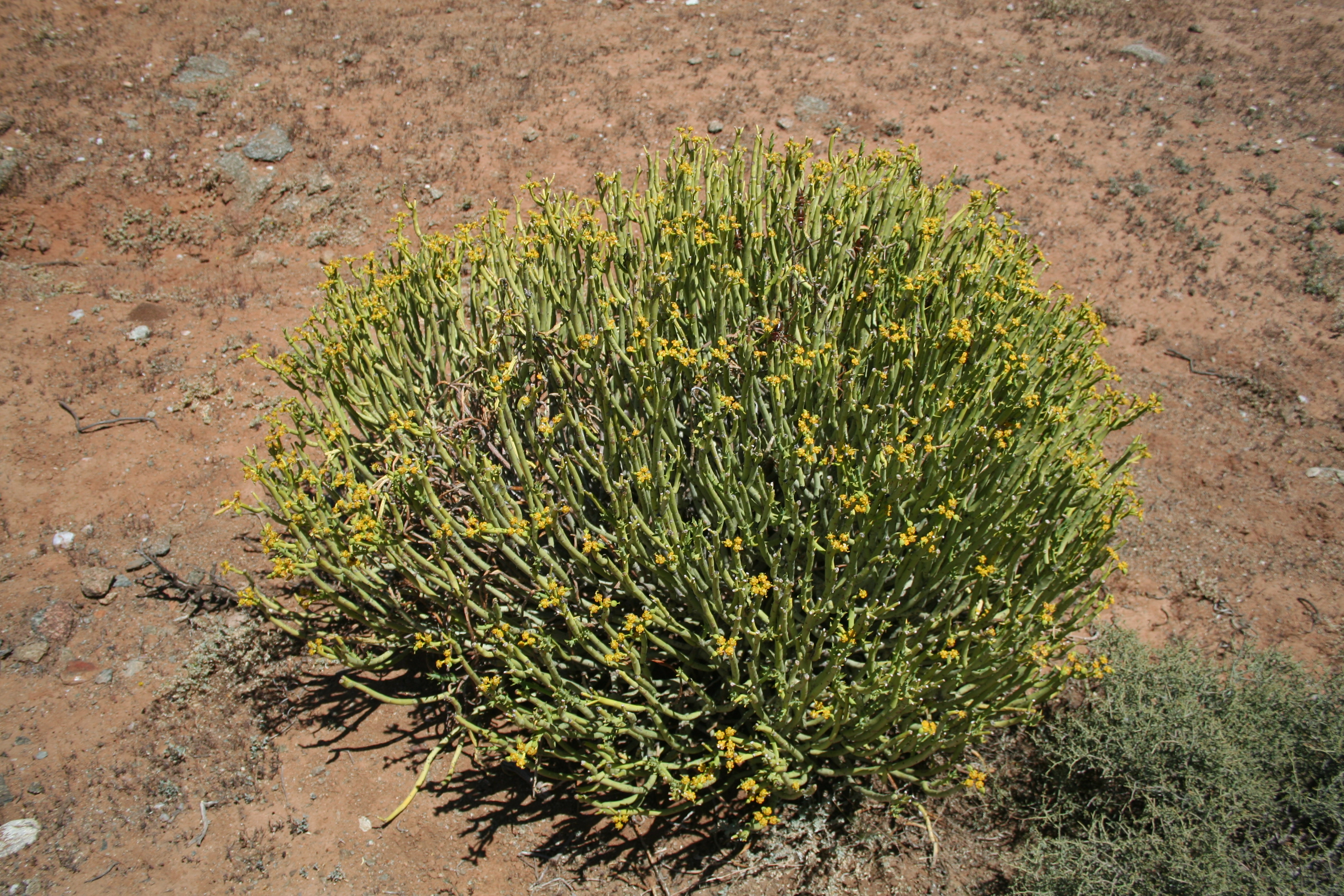

Conservation status
- Least Concern (SANBI Red List)

Scientific classification
- Kingdom: Plantae
- Clade: Tracheophytes
- Clade: Angiosperms
- Clade: Eudicots
- Clade: Rosids
- Order: Malpighiales
- Family: Euphorbiaceae
- Genus: Euphorbia
- Species: E. mauritanica

Binomial name
- Euphorbia mauritanica L.

Synonyms
- Euphorbia corallothamnus Dinter; Euphorbia melanosticta E.Mey. ex Boiss.; Euphorbia paxiana Dinter; Euphorbia sarcostemmatoides Dinter; Tirucalia mauritanica (L.) P.V.Heath; Tirucalia paxiana (Dinter) P.V.Heath; Tirucalia sarcostemmatoides (Dinter) P.V.Heath; Tithymalus brachypus Klotzsch & Garcke; Tithymalus flaccidus Moench; Tithymalus mauritanicus (L.) Haw.; Tithymalus zeyheri Klotzsch & Garcke

= Euphorbia mauritanica =

Species of succulent plant found in Africa

Euphorbia mauritanica, commonly known as yellow milk bush or golden spurge, is a species of plant in the family Euphorbiaceae native to Africa.

== Distribution ==
Euphorbia mauritanica is found in most of Southern Africa. It occurs extensively throughout the Northern Cape, Western Cape, Eastern Cape, Free State and KwaZulu-Natal, as well as in Namibia. It is dominant in the Succulent Karoo, in valleys and on hillsides. It has been introduced to India.
