= Eriospermum pubescens =

Scientific classification
- Kingdom: Plantae
- Clade: Tracheophytes
- Clade: Angiosperms
- Clade: Monocots
- Order: Asparagales
- Family: Asparagaceae
- Subfamily: Nolinoideae
- Genus: Eriospermum
- Species: E. pubescens

Binomial name
- Eriospermum pubescens jacquin

Species of flowering plant

Eriospermum pubescens is a species of geophytic plant of the genus Eriospermum, indigenous to the southern Cape, South Africa.

== Description ==
The leaf is heart-shaped (7 cm long, 6 cm wide), relatively hairless (sometimes with straight hairs pressed flat against the leaf surface, especially on the underside), and held prostrate against the ground.

Several related species, such as Eriospermum capense, Eriospermum breviscapum and Eriospermum zeyheri, have a similar heart-shaped leaf.

The tuber is irregular shaped, with reddish-purple flesh, and the plants can offset and form clusters. This species flowers from February to April.

== Distribution and habitat ==
Eriospermum pubescens occurs in renosterveld vegetation, in clay-rich soils across the southern Cape, South Africa. It occurs from Ceres in the north, southwards to Somerset West, and eastwards as far as Knysna.
