= Eriospermum exile =

Scientific classification
- Kingdom: Plantae
- Clade: Tracheophytes
- Clade: Angiosperms
- Clade: Monocots
- Order: Asparagales
- Family: Asparagaceae
- Subfamily: Convallarioideae
- Genus: Eriospermum
- Species: E. exile

Binomial name
- Eriospermum exile Perry

Species of flowering plant

Eriospermum exile is a species of geophytic plant of the genus Eriospermum, indigenous to South Africa.

== Description ==
This species has a single, erect, slender, linear to lanceolate leaf (125mm long and 8mm wide). The leaf has a very thin stalk (petiole).

The tuber is pear-shaped and white inside.

== Distribution and habitat ==
It is indigenous to Beaufort group shales or quartzite, rocky soils, often on sheltered south-east facing slopes, in the Robertson Karoo, Little Karoo and western Great Karoo regions of South Africa. It occurs from Worcester in the west, eastwards as far as the town of De Rust.
