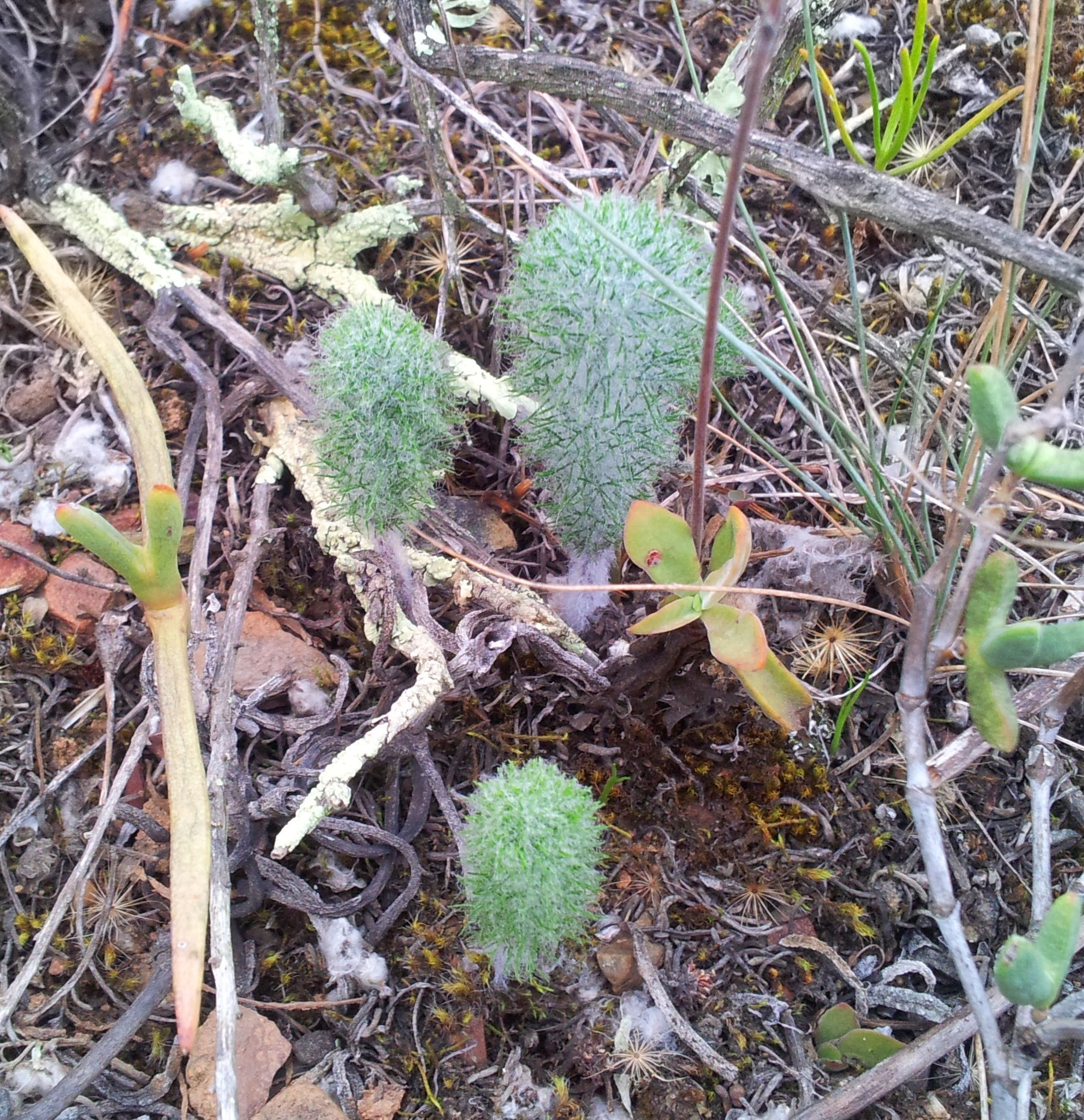

Scientific classification
- Kingdom: Plantae
- Clade: Tracheophytes
- Clade: Angiosperms
- Clade: Monocots
- Order: Asparagales
- Family: Asparagaceae
- Subfamily: Nolinoideae
- Genus: Eriospermum
- Species: E. paradoxum

Binomial name
- Eriospermum paradoxum (Jacq.) Ker Gawl.

= Eriospermum paradoxum =

Species of flowering plant

Eriospermum paradoxum ("haasklossie") is a species of geophytic plant of the genus Eriospermum, indigenous to the Cape region of South Africa. Its habitat is sandy or rocky clay soils in arid winter-rainfall areas. It is a bit peculiar in having a true leaf that is like the scale-leaves of some junipers, from which emerges an enation up to 15 cm (5.9 in) in height and half as wide. but is semisucculent in nature.
