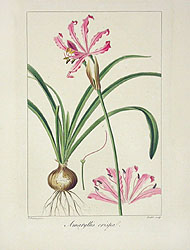
- Hessea cinnamomea

Scientific classification
- Kingdom: Plantae
- Clade: Embryophytes
- Clade: Tracheophytes
- Clade: Angiosperms
- Clade: Monocots
- Order: Asparagales
- Family: Amaryllidaceae
- Subfamily: Amaryllidoideae
- Subtribe: Strumariinae
- Genus: Hessea; Herb. 1837, conserved name not P. J. Bergius ex D. F. L. von Schlechtendal 1826 (syn of Carpolyza in Amaryllidaceae)

Type species
- Hessea stellaris (Jacq.) Herb.

Synonyms
- Imhofia Herb. 1821, illegitimate homonym not Heister 1755; Periphanes Salisb.; Kamiesbergia Snijman; Dewinterella D.Müll.-Doblies & U.Müll.-Doblies

= Hessea =

Genus of flowering plants

Hessea is a genus of bulb-forming plants in the Amaryllis family native to Namibia and South Africa. The genus name commemorates C. H. F. Hesse (1772–1832), who resided in Cape Town from 1800 to 1817.

== Description ==
The stigma is trifid.

== Taxonomy ==
It was published by William Herbert in 1837 with Hessea stellaris (Jacq.) Herb. as the type species.

=== Species ===
Species

1. Hessea breviflora Herb.
2. Hessea cinnamomea (L'Hér.) T.Durand & Schinz
3. Hessea incana Snijman
4. Hessea mathewsii W.F.Barker
5. Hessea monticola Snijman
6. Hessea pilosula D.Müll.-Doblies & U.Müll.-Doblies
7. Hessea pulcherrima (D.Müll.-Doblies & U.Müll.-Doblies) Snijman
8. Hessea pusilla Snijman
9. Hessea speciosa Snijman
10. Hessea stellaris (Jacq.) Herb.
11. Hessea stenosiphon (Snijman) D.Müll.-Doblies & U.Müll.-Doblies
12. Hessea tenuipedicellata Snijman
13. Hessea undosa Snijman

=== Formerly included ===
The following species were formerly included: Several species have been coined using the name Hessea, which refer to species now considered better suited to genera Namaquanula, Nerine or Strumaria:

- Hessea bruce-bayeri - Namaquanula bruce-bayeri
- Hessea burchelliana - Strumaria gemmata
- Hessea chaplinii - Strumaria chaplinii
- Hessea filifolia - Strumaria tenella
- Hessea gemmata - Strumaria gemmata
- Hessea karooica - Strumaria karooica
- Hessea leipoldtii - Strumaria leipoldtii
- Hessea rehmannii - Nerine rehmannii
- Hessea spiralis - Strumaria pygmaea
- Hessea spiralis - Strumaria spiralis
- Hessea tenella - Strumaria tenella
- Hessea unguiculata - Strumaria unguiculata
- Hessea vaginata - Strumaria truncata
