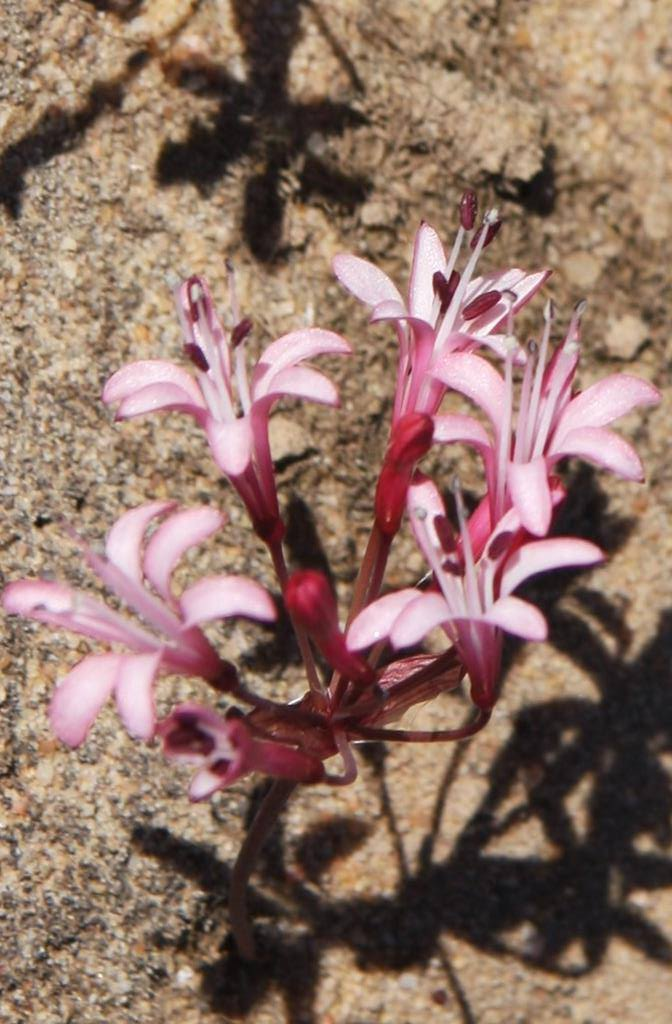
- Strumaria watermeyeri, in habitat near Nieuwoudtville, South Africa

Scientific classification
- Kingdom: Plantae
- Clade: Tracheophytes
- Clade: Angiosperms
- Clade: Monocots
- Order: Asparagales
- Family: Amaryllidaceae
- Subfamily: Amaryllidoideae
- Genus: Strumaria; Jacq.

Type species
- Strumaria truncata Jacq.

Synonyms
- Carpolyza Salisb.; Hessea P.J.Bergius ex Schltdl. 1826, rejected homononym not Herb. 1837; Nesynstylis Raf.; Eudolon Salisb.; Gemmaria Salisb.; Hymenetron Salisb.; Pugionella Salisb.; Stylago Salisb.; Bokkeveldia D.Müll.-Doblies & U.Müll.-Doblies; Tedingea D.Müll.-Doblies & U.Müll.-Doblies

= Strumaria =

Genus of plants

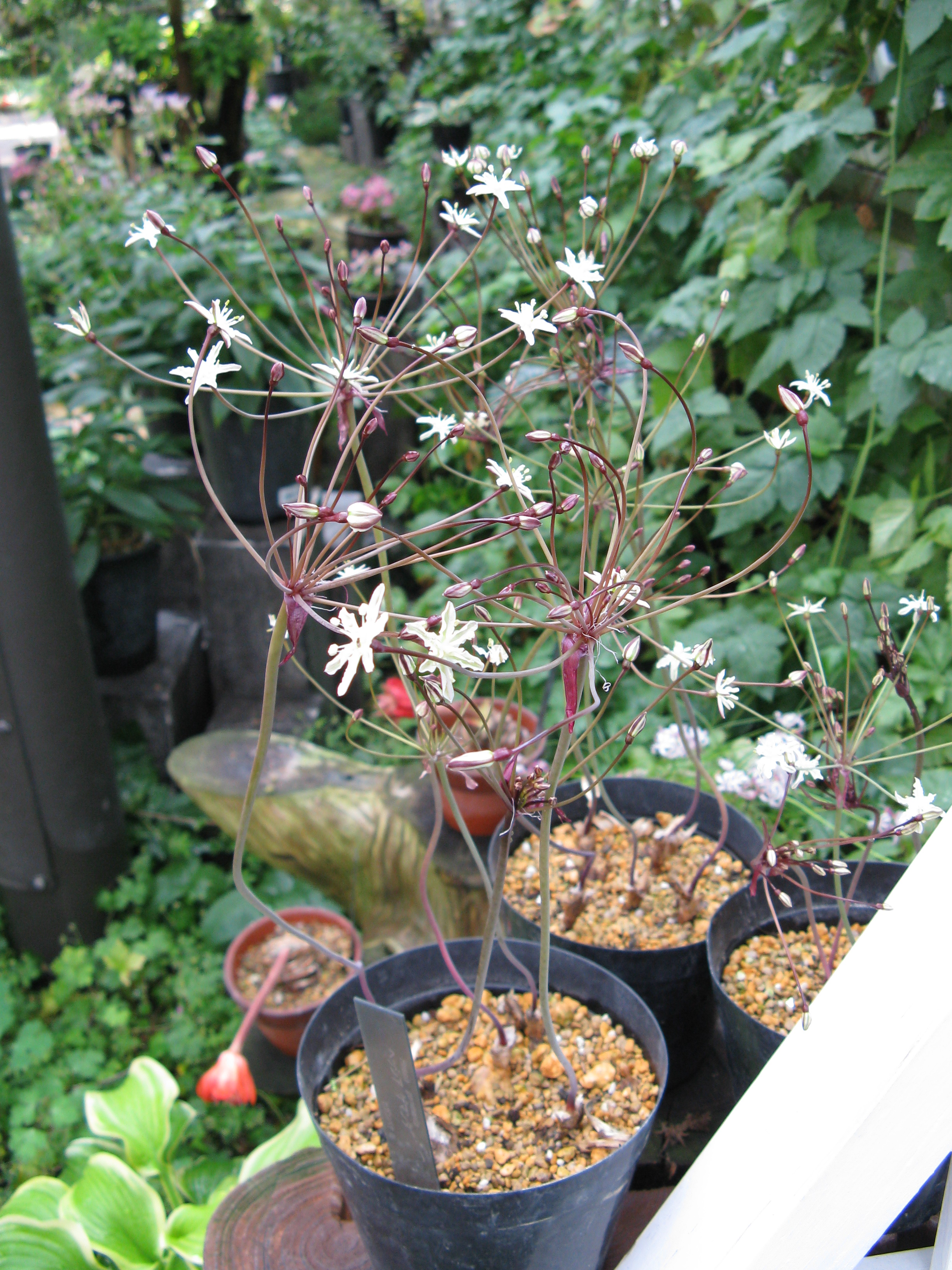
Strumaria gemmata in cultivation

Strumaria is a genus of African plants in Amaryllis family, subfamily Amaryllidoideae. The genus is known in nature only from South Africa, Lesotho and Namibia. Almost all species flower in the autumn and are cultivated as ornamental bulbous plants.

== Description ==
Species of Strumaria are deciduous bulbous plants. Their bulbs are generally small, around 7–35 mm (0.3–1.4 in) in diameter with a fibrous bulb tunic. Usually two leaves are produced, although there may be up to six. The flowers generally appear in the autumn with the arrival of the rains; the leaves may appear before, with, or after the flowers. The inflorescence is 20–40 cm (8–16 in) tall, with an umbel of two to 30 flowers, generally carried on long pedicels. Most species have white flowers, although they may also be pink or yellow. The six stamens are joined to the style, at least at the base. Strumaria is distinguished from other genera in the family Amaryllidaceae by the presence of a thickening at the base of the style, except in Strumaria spiralis, previously placed in its own genus Carpolyza. The seeds are reddish-green when ripe, with a diameter of 2–5 mm (0.1–0.2 in). When dry, the fruiting heads detach from the scape and are rolled away by the wind, thus dispersing the seeds.

== Taxonomy ==
It was published by Nikolaus Joseph von Jacquin in 1797. The lectotype species is Strumaria truncata Jacq.

=== Species ===
Accepted (as of April 2022):

- Strumaria aestivalis Snijman – Northern Cape Province
- Strumaria argillicola G.D.Duncan – Northern Cape Province
- Strumaria barbarae Oberm. – Namibia, Northern Cape Province
- Strumaria bidentata Schinz – Namibia, Northern Cape Province
- Strumaria chaplinii (W.F.Barker) Snijman – Western Cape Province
- Strumaria discifera Marloth ex Snijman – Western Cape Province, Northern Cape Province
- Strumaria gemmata Ker Gawl. – Western Cape Province, Northern Cape Province, Eastern Cape Province, Free State
- Strumaria hardyana D.Müll.-Doblies & U.Müll.-Doblies – Namibia
- Strumaria karooica (W.F.Barker) Snijman – Western Cape Province, Northern Cape Province
- Strumaria karoopoortensis (D.Müll.-Doblies & U.Müll.-Doblies) Snijman – Western Cape Province, Northern Cape Province
- Strumaria leipoldtii (L.Bolus) Snijman – Western Cape Province
- Strumaria luteoloba Snijman – Namibia, Northern Cape Province
- Strumaria massoniella (D.Müll.-Doblies & U.Müll.-Doblies) Snijman – Northern Cape Province
- Strumaria merxmuelleriana (D.Müll.-Doblies & U.Müll.-Doblies) Snijman – Northern Cape Province
- Strumaria perryae Snijman – Northern Cape Province
- Strumaria phonolithica Dinter – Namibia
- Strumaria picta W.F.Barker – Northern Cape Province
- Strumaria prolifera Snijman – Northern Cape Province
- Strumaria pubescens W.F.Barker – Western Cape Province, Northern Cape Province
- Strumaria pygmaea Snijman – Western Cape Province, Northern Cape Province
- Strumaria salteri W.F.Barker – Western Cape Province
- Strumaria speciosa Snijman – Namibia
- Strumaria spiralis (L'Hér.) W.T.Aiton – Western Cape Province
- Strumaria tenella (L.f.) Snijman – Western Cape Province, Northern Cape Province, Lesotho
- Strumaria truncata Jacq. – Western Cape Province, Northern Cape Province, Namibia
- Strumaria unguiculata (W.F.Barker) Snijman – Western Cape Province, Northern Cape Province
- Strumaria villosa Snijman – Northern Cape Province
- Strumaria watermeyeri L.Bolus – Northern Cape Province

Formerly included

A few names have been coined using the name Strumaria, applied to species now considered better suited to other genera (Hessea and Libertia).

- Strumaria chilensis - Libertia chilensis
- Strumaria crispa - Hessea cinnamomea
- Strumaria stellaris - Hessea stellaris

== Distribution and habitat ==
Species of Strumaria are native to South Africa (the Cape Provinces and the Free State), Lesotho and Namibia. All but one species are found in the winter rainfall area of Southern Africa, to the west and southwest, with the highest concentration in the highlands of Namaqualand. The exception is Strumaria tenella subsp. orientalis, found to the east in the Free State and Lesotho.

== Cultivation ==
Some Strumaria species are cultivated as ornamental bulbous plants, particularly for their autumn flowering period. Although they will survive a minimum temperature of 0 °C (32 °F), a higher minimum of 8 °C (46 °F) is recommended, for example in a cool greenhouse. The medium in which they are grown needs to be free-draining. They can be propagated from seeds, which lack dormancy and so need to be sown as soon as possible after being shed.
