= Strumaria salteri =

Scientific classification
- Kingdom: Plantae
- Clade: Embryophytes
- Clade: Tracheophytes
- Clade: Angiosperms
- Clade: Monocots
- Order: Asparagales
- Family: Amaryllidaceae
- Subfamily: Amaryllidoideae
- Genus: Strumaria
- Species: S. salteri

Binomial name
- Strumaria salteri W.F.Barker

Synonyms
- Bokkeveldia salteri (W.F.Barker) D.Müll.-Doblies & U.Müll.-Doblies

Species of flowering plant

Strumaria salteri is a species of flowering plant in the family Amaryllidaceae, native to the Cape Provinces of South Africa, where it is found in seasonally moist sandstone outcrops. It has a loose inflorescence with pinkish flowers, the colour coming from the midribs of the tepals, similar to Strumaria gemmata. It was first described by Winsome Fanny Barker in 1944.
