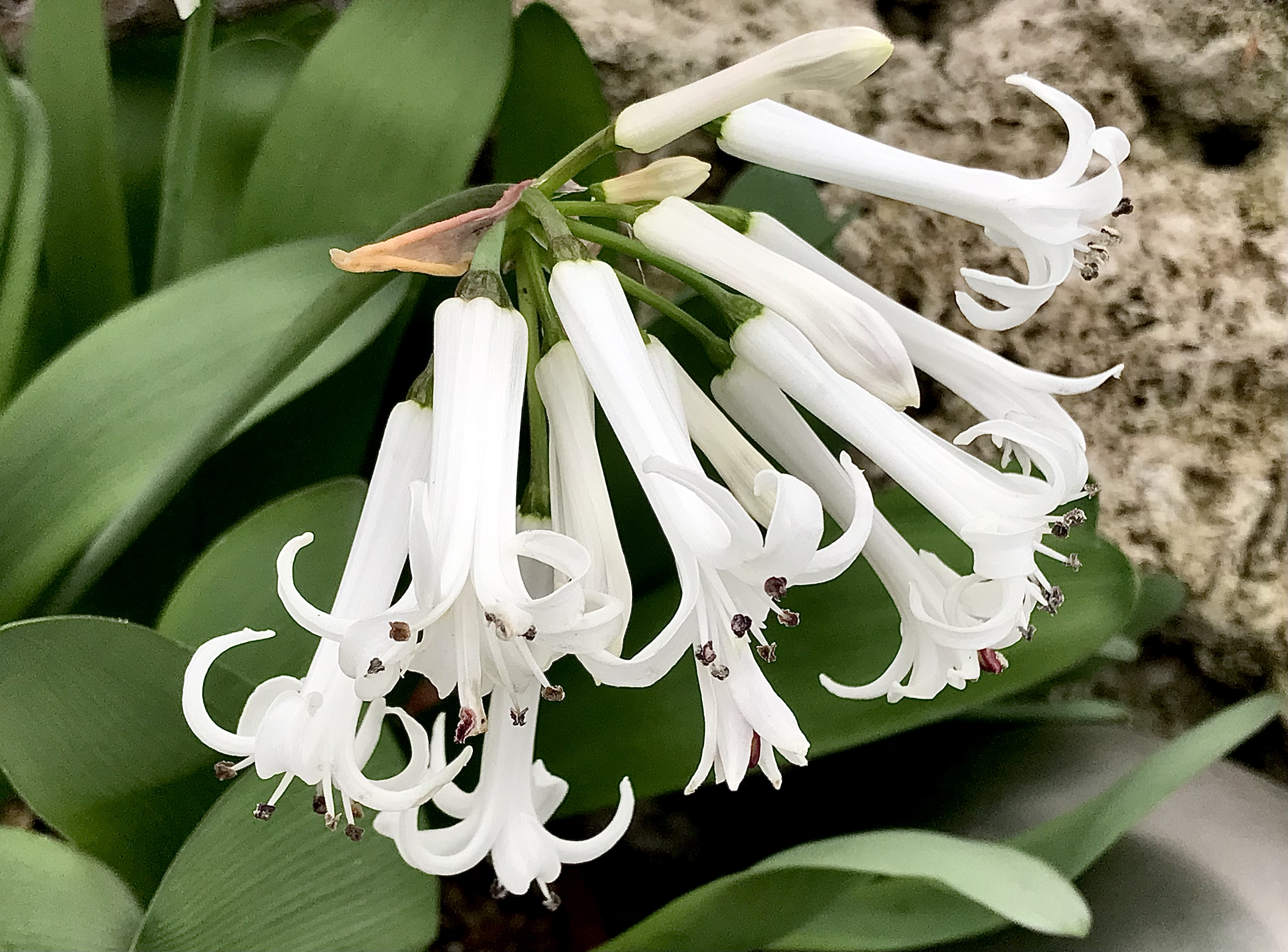
- Cultivated specimen, Davies Alpine House, Kew Gardens

Conservation status
- Least Concern (IUCN 3.1)

Scientific classification
- Kingdom: Plantae
- Clade: Tracheophytes
- Clade: Angiosperms
- Clade: Monocots
- Order: Asparagales
- Family: Amaryllidaceae
- Subfamily: Amaryllidoideae
- Genus: Strumaria
- Species: S. phonolithica

Binomial name
- Strumaria phonolithica Dinter

Synonyms
- Strumaria gigantea D.Müll.-Doblies & U.Müll.-Doblies

= Strumaria phonolithica =

Species of bulbous flowering plant

Strumaria phonolithica is an Amaryllidaceous plant species (tribe Amaryllideae) endemic to Namibia. Its narrow funnel-shaped flowers are, jointly with those of Strumaria barbarae, the largest in the genus. It grows in subtropical shrubland, tropical dry shrubland and rocky areas in the Aurus and Klinghardt Mountains of the Tsau ǁKhaeb Sperrgebiet National Park in southwestern Namibia, where it is usually to be found growing in phonolite gravels (- whence the specific name phonolithica)

== Growth habit ==
Although the plants occur in large clumps, this is not the result of vegetative reproduction : the bulbs are solitary and thus do not form daughter bulbs (offsets), the clumps forming as a result of seeds (from sexual reproduction) germinating close together.
