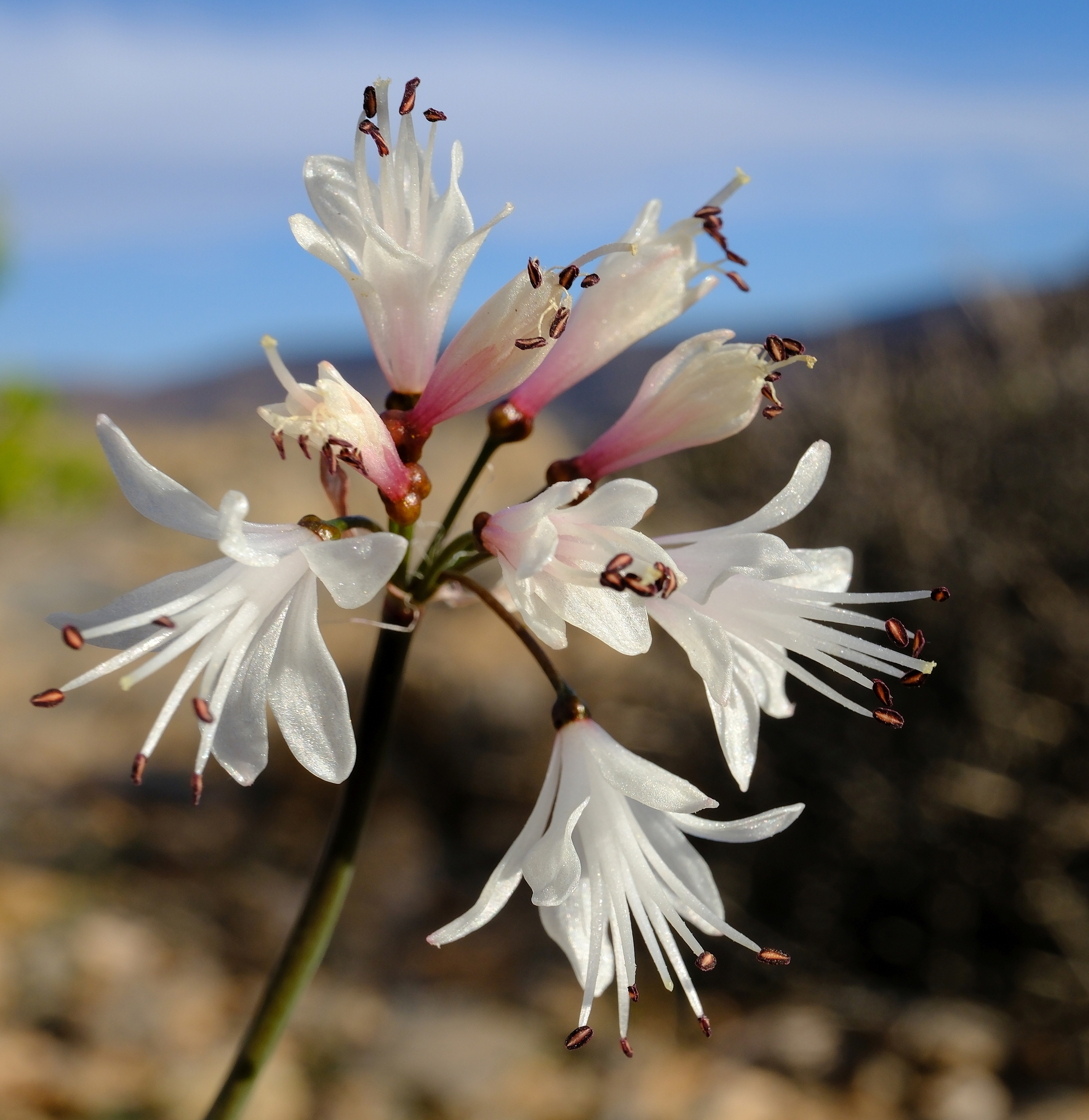

Conservation status
- Least Concern (IUCN 3.1)

Scientific classification
- Kingdom: Plantae
- Clade: Tracheophytes
- Clade: Angiosperms
- Clade: Monocots
- Order: Asparagales
- Family: Amaryllidaceae
- Subfamily: Amaryllidoideae
- Genus: Strumaria
- Species: S. hardyana

Binomial name
- Strumaria hardyana D.Müller-Doblies & U. Müll.-Doblies

= Strumaria hardyana =

Species of shrub

Strumaria hardyana is a species of plant that is endemic to Namibia. Its natural habitats are subtropical or tropical dry shrubland and rocky areas. It is one of the three species of Strumaria with nodding rather than outward-facing flowers. It can be distinguished from the similar species Strumaria truncata by the narrow membranous margin to the leaves, which are not twisted.
