= Hessea incana =

Scientific classification
- Kingdom: Plantae
- Clade: Tracheophytes
- Clade: Angiosperms
- Clade: Monocots
- Order: Asparagales
- Family: Amaryllidaceae
- Subfamily: Amaryllidoideae
- Genus: Hessea
- Species: H. incana

Binomial name
- Hessea incana Snijman

Species of flowering plant

Hessea incana, commonly known as the Kamies sambreetjie, is a perennial flowering plant and geophyte belonging to the genus Hessea. The species is endemic to the Northern Cape and occurs on the Kamiesberge in Namaqualand. There are three subpopulations and the plant is threatened by overgrazing and trampling by livestock.
