= Hessea pusilla =

Scientific classification
- Kingdom: Plantae
- Clade: Tracheophytes
- Clade: Angiosperms
- Clade: Monocots
- Order: Asparagales
- Family: Amaryllidaceae
- Subfamily: Amaryllidoideae
- Genus: Hessea
- Species: H. pusilla

Binomial name
- Hessea pusilla Snijman

Species of flowering plant

Hessea pusilla is a perennial flowering plant and geophyte that belongs to the genus Hessea and is part of the fynbos. The species is endemic to the Northern Cape and occurs on the northern Bokkeveldberge at Perdekraal.
