= Hessea mathewsii =

Scientific classification
- Kingdom: Plantae
- Clade: Tracheophytes
- Clade: Angiosperms
- Clade: Monocots
- Order: Asparagales
- Family: Amaryllidaceae
- Subfamily: Amaryllidoideae
- Genus: Hessea
- Species: H. mathewsii

Binomial name
- Hessea mathewsii W.F.Barker

Synonyms
- Dewinterella mathewsii (W.F.Barker) D.Müll.-Doblies & U.Müll.-Doblies; Gemmaria mathewsii (W.F.Barker) D.Müll.-Doblies & U.Müll.-Doblies

Species of flowering plant

Hessea mathewsii is a perennial flowering plant and geophyte that belongs to the genus Hessea and is part of the Saldanha strandveld. The species is endemic to the Western Cape and has an area of occurrence of only 30 km². It occurs from Vredenburg to Langebaanweg. There are four fragmented subpopulations and the plant is threatened by overgrazing and development. The population is unstable and the numbers are decreasing.
