= Strumaria villosa =

Scientific classification
- Kingdom: Plantae
- Clade: Tracheophytes
- Clade: Angiosperms
- Clade: Monocots
- Order: Asparagales
- Family: Amaryllidaceae
- Subfamily: Amaryllidoideae
- Genus: Strumaria
- Species: S. villosa

Binomial name
- Strumaria villosa Snijman

Species of flowering plant

Strumaria villosa is a perennial flowering plant and geophyte belonging to the genus Strumaria. The species is endemic to the Northern Cape and occurs from Eksteenfontein to Steinkopf. The plant is threatened by overgrazing and trampling by livestock.
