= Strumaria speciosa =

Scientific classification
- Kingdom: Plantae
- Clade: Tracheophytes
- Clade: Angiosperms
- Clade: Monocots
- Order: Asparagales
- Family: Amaryllidaceae
- Subfamily: Amaryllidoideae
- Genus: Strumaria
- Species: S. speciosa

Binomial name
- Strumaria speciosa Snijman

Species of flowering plant

Strumaria speciosa is a perennial flowering plant and geophyte belonging to the genus Strumaria. The species is endemic to Namibia.
