= Strumaria luteoloba =

Scientific classification
- Kingdom: Plantae
- Clade: Tracheophytes
- Clade: Angiosperms
- Clade: Monocots
- Order: Asparagales
- Family: Amaryllidaceae
- Subfamily: Amaryllidoideae
- Genus: Strumaria
- Species: S. luteoloba

Binomial name
- Strumaria luteoloba Snijman

Species of flowering plant

Strumaria luteoloba is a perennial flowering plant and geophyte belonging to the genus Strumaria. The species is native to the Northern Cape and Namibia. It occurs from southern Namibia to Eksteenfontein in the Richtersveld. There is only one population that is threatened by overgrazing and trampling by livestock.
