= Hessea undosa =

Scientific classification
- Kingdom: Plantae
- Clade: Tracheophytes
- Clade: Angiosperms
- Clade: Monocots
- Order: Asparagales
- Family: Amaryllidaceae
- Subfamily: Amaryllidoideae
- Genus: Hessea
- Species: H. undosa

Binomial name
- Hessea undosa Snijman

Species of flowering plant

Hessea undosa is a perennial flowering plant and geophyte that belongs to the genus Hessea and is part of the Bokkeveld sandstone fynbos. The species is endemic to the Western Cape and occurs in the Gifberge and Matsikammaberge. There are three subpopulations and the plant grows in seasonally waterlogged areas. The plant is threatened by the planting of rooibos tea because the plowing of fields causes the water to seep into the soil.
