= Hessea tenuipedicellata =

Scientific classification
- Kingdom: Plantae
- Clade: Tracheophytes
- Clade: Angiosperms
- Clade: Monocots
- Order: Asparagales
- Family: Amaryllidaceae
- Subfamily: Amaryllidoideae
- Genus: Hessea
- Species: H. tenuipedicellata

Binomial name
- Hessea tenuipedicellata Snijman

Species of flowering plant

Hessea tenuipedicellata is a perennial flowering plant and geophyte belonging to the genus Hessea. The species is endemic to the Western Cape and occurs on the northern Knersvlakte. There is one subpopulation and the plant is threatened by porcupines digging holes in search of other species.
