= Strumaria argillicola =

Scientific classification
- Kingdom: Plantae
- Clade: Tracheophytes
- Clade: Angiosperms
- Clade: Monocots
- Order: Asparagales
- Family: Amaryllidaceae
- Subfamily: Amaryllidoideae
- Genus: Strumaria
- Species: S. argillicola

Binomial name
- Strumaria argillicola G.D.Duncan

Species of flowering plant

Strumaria argillicola is a perennial flowering plant and geophyte belonging to the genus Strumaria. The species is endemic to the Northern Cape and occurs in Namaqualand.
