= Hessea speciosa =

Scientific classification
- Kingdom: Plantae
- Clade: Tracheophytes
- Clade: Angiosperms
- Clade: Monocots
- Order: Asparagales
- Family: Amaryllidaceae
- Subfamily: Amaryllidoideae
- Genus: Hessea
- Species: H. speciosa

Binomial name
- Hessea speciosa Snijman

Species of flowering plant

Hessea speciosa, commonly known as the coconut umbrella lily, is a perennial flowering plant and geophyte belonging to the genus Hessea. The species is native to Namibia and the Northern Cape.
