= Hessea monticola =

Scientific classification
- Kingdom: Plantae
- Clade: Tracheophytes
- Clade: Angiosperms
- Clade: Monocots
- Order: Asparagales
- Family: Amaryllidaceae
- Subfamily: Amaryllidoideae
- Genus: Hessea
- Species: H. monticola

Binomial name
- Hessea monticola Snijman

Species of flowering plant

Hessea monticola is a perennial flowering plant and geophyte that belongs to the genus Hessea and is part of the fynbos. The species is endemic to the Western Cape and occurs from Piketberg and the Cederberg to Bot River and further east to Swellendam. The population is stable.
