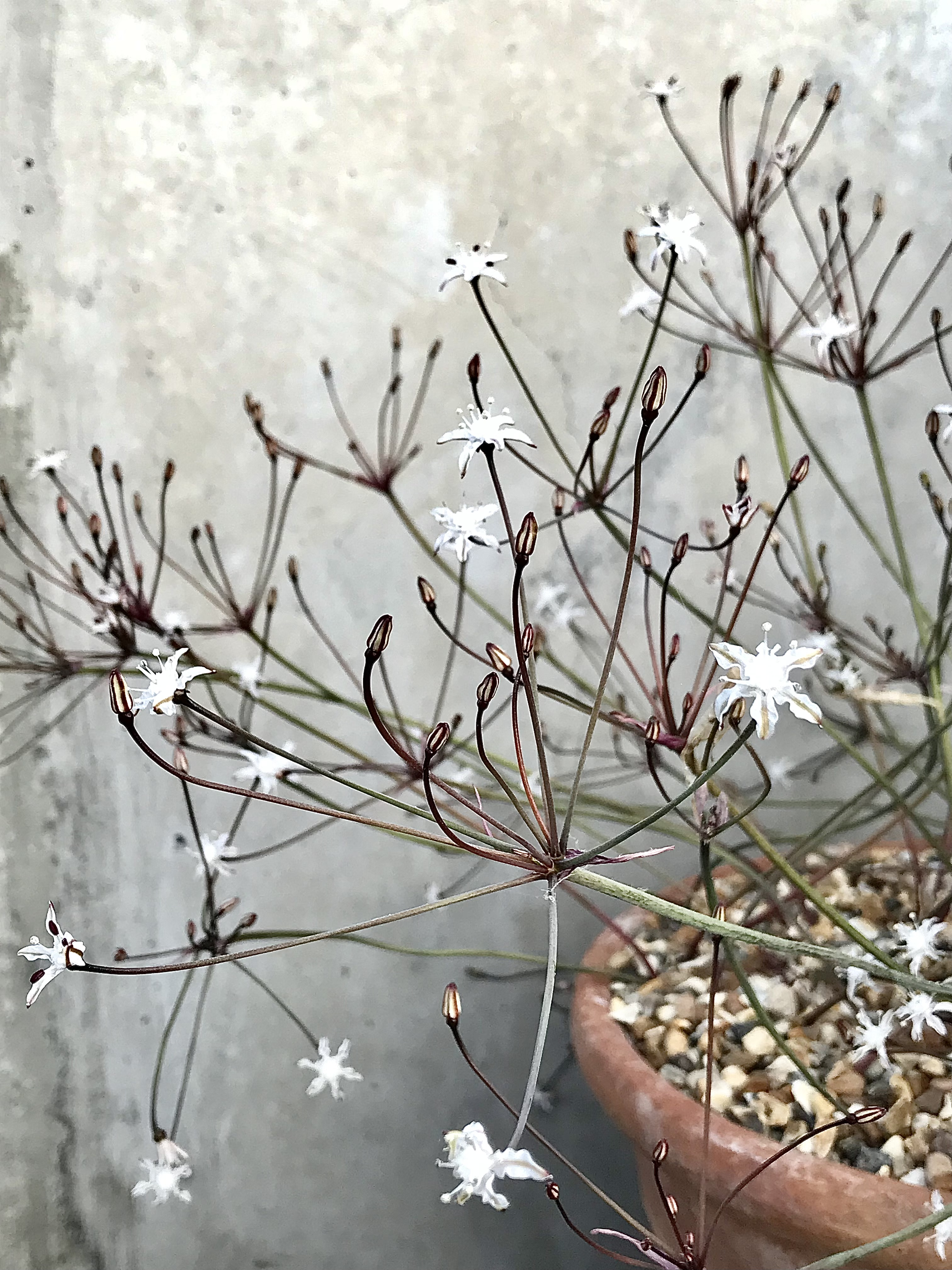
- Strumaria discifera subsp. bulbifera

Scientific classification
- Kingdom: Plantae
- Clade: Tracheophytes
- Clade: Angiosperms
- Clade: Monocots
- Order: Asparagales
- Family: Amaryllidaceae
- Subfamily: Amaryllidoideae
- Genus: Strumaria
- Species: S. discifera

Binomial name
- Strumaria discifera Marloth ex Snijman

Synonyms
- Gemmaria discifera (Marloth ex Snijman) D.Müll.-Doblies & U.Müll.-Doblies

= Strumaria discifera =

Species of flowering plant

Strumaria discifera is a species of flowering plant in the family Amaryllidaceae, native to west and south-west Cape Provinces. It was first described in 1992.

== Description ==
Strumaria discifera is similar to Strumaria chaplinii, i.e. a relatively small plant for the genus Strumaria with star-shaped white flowers on umbels. It can be distinguished by its tepals, which are channelled rather than flat. Like almost all species in the genus, it flowers with the autumn rains.

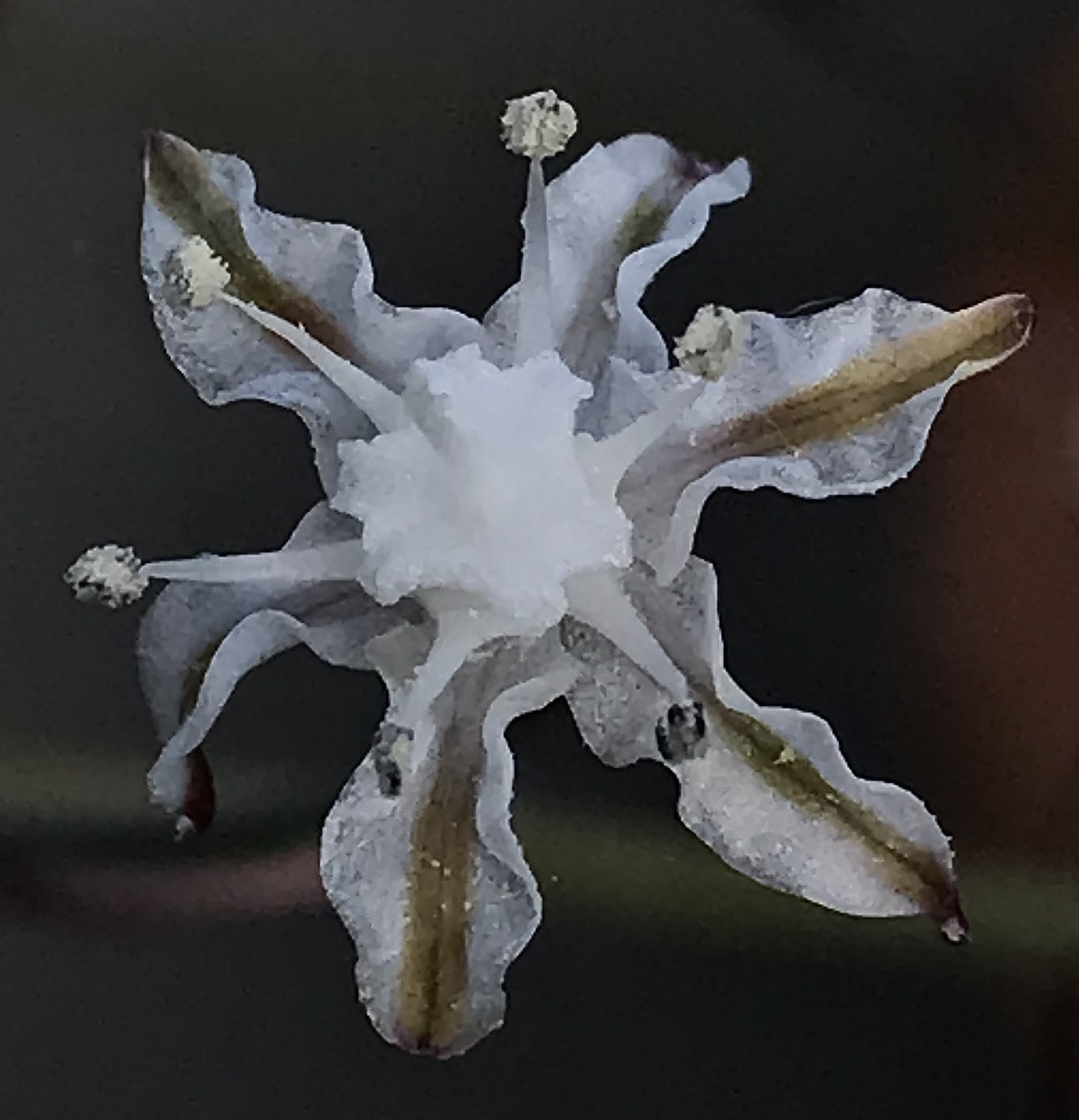
Strumaria discifera ssp. bulbifera - single flower, greatly magnified

== Taxonomy ==
Strumaria discifera was first described in 1992 by Dierdré A. Snijman who attributed the name to the earlier South African botanist, Rudolf Marloth. Two subspecies are accepted as of April 2022:

- Strumaria discifera subsp. bulbifera Snijman
- Strumaria discifera subsp. discifera

S. discifera subsp. bulbifera forms large clumps of bulbs; S. discifera subsp. discifera is solitary.

== Distribution and habitat ==
Strumaria discifera is native to the west and south-west Cape Provinces of South Africa. Species of Strumaria grow in areas that are seasonally moist.
