= Namaquanula bruynsii =

Scientific classification
- Kingdom: Plantae
- Clade: Tracheophytes
- Clade: Angiosperms
- Clade: Monocots
- Order: Asparagales
- Family: Amaryllidaceae
- Subfamily: Amaryllidoideae
- Genus: Namaquanula
- Species: N. bruynsii

Binomial name
- Namaquanula bruynsii Snijman

Species of flowering plant

Namaquanula bruynsii is a rare, bulbous perennial plant in the Amaryllidaceae family, specifically within the subtribe Strumariinae. The species is endemic to Namibia. It was first described in 2005 by South African botanist Dierdré A. Snijman and is named in honour of Dr. Peter Vincent Bruyns, who discovered the species in 2001.
