= Hessea pilosula =

Scientific classification
- Kingdom: Plantae
- Clade: Tracheophytes
- Clade: Angiosperms
- Clade: Monocots
- Order: Asparagales
- Family: Amaryllidaceae
- Subfamily: Amaryllidoideae
- Genus: Hessea
- Species: H. pilosula

Binomial name
- Hessea pilosula D.Müll.-Doblies & U.Müll.-Doblies

Species of flowering plant

Hessea pilosula, commonly known as the wash sambreeltjie, is a perennial flowering plant and geophyte that belongs to the genus Hessea and is part of the Succulent Karoo. The species is endemic to the Northern Cape and occurs from Steinkopf to Hondeklip Bay. The population is stable and the plant is considered rare.
