= Strumaria bidentata =

Scientific classification
- Kingdom: Plantae
- Clade: Tracheophytes
- Clade: Angiosperms
- Clade: Monocots
- Order: Asparagales
- Family: Amaryllidaceae
- Subfamily: Amaryllidoideae
- Genus: Strumaria
- Species: S. bidentata

Binomial name
- Strumaria bidentata Schinz

Species of flowering plant

Strumaria bidentata is a perennial flowering plant and geophyte belonging to the genus Strumaria. The species is native to the Northern Cape and Namibia. It occurs in the Richtersveld and Sperrgebiet in Namibia. It has a range of less than 70 km^{2} and there is only one population. The plant is threatened by overgrazing and mining activities.
