= Hessea stenosiphon =

Scientific classification
- Kingdom: Plantae
- Clade: Tracheophytes
- Clade: Angiosperms
- Clade: Monocots
- Order: Asparagales
- Family: Amaryllidaceae
- Subfamily: Amaryllidoideae
- Genus: Hessea
- Species: H. stenosiphon

Binomial name
- Hessea stenosiphon (Snijman) D.Müll.-Doblies & U.Müll.-Doblies

Synonyms
- Kamiesbergia stenosiphon Snijman

Species of flowering plant

Hessea stenosiphon is a perennial flowering plant and geophyte that belongs to the genus Hessea and is part of the fynbos. The species is endemic to the Northern Cape and occurs in Namaqualand on the Kamiesberge. There are five subpopulations and the plant is considered rare.
