= Strumaria prolifera =

Scientific classification
- Kingdom: Plantae
- Clade: Tracheophytes
- Clade: Angiosperms
- Clade: Monocots
- Order: Asparagales
- Family: Amaryllidaceae
- Subfamily: Amaryllidoideae
- Genus: Strumaria
- Species: S. prolifera

Binomial name
- Strumaria prolifera Snijman

Species of flowering plant

Strumaria prolifera is a perennial flowering plant and geophyte belonging to the genus Strumaria and is part of the Succulent Karoo. The species is endemic to the Northern Cape and occurs in Namaqualand on the Koukamma Mountains. Here it grows high on the southern slopes in the shade. The plant is considered critically rare, the population is estimated to be no more than 100 plants.
