= Strumaria karooica =

Scientific classification
- Kingdom: Plantae
- Clade: Tracheophytes
- Clade: Angiosperms
- Clade: Monocots
- Order: Asparagales
- Family: Amaryllidaceae
- Subfamily: Amaryllidoideae
- Genus: Strumaria
- Species: S. karooica

Binomial name
- Strumaria karooica (W.F.Barker) Snijman

Synonyms
- Gemmaria karooica (W.F.Barker) D.Müll.-Doblies & U.Müll.-Doblies; Hessea karooica W.F.Barker; Periphanes karooica (W.F.Barker) F.M.Leight.

Species of flowering plant

Strumaria karooica is a perennial flowering plant and geophyte belonging to the genus Strumaria and is part of the Succulent Karoo vegetation. The species is endemic to the Northern Cape and the Western Cape. It occurs from Middelpos to Sutherland and Matjiesfontein. The plant is considered rare.
