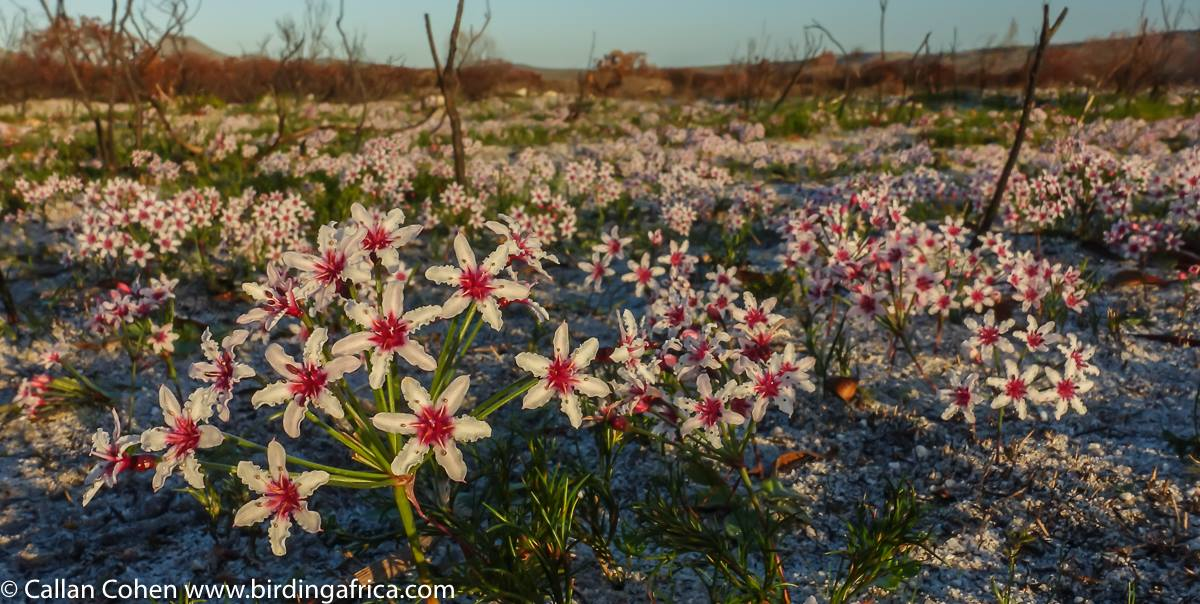

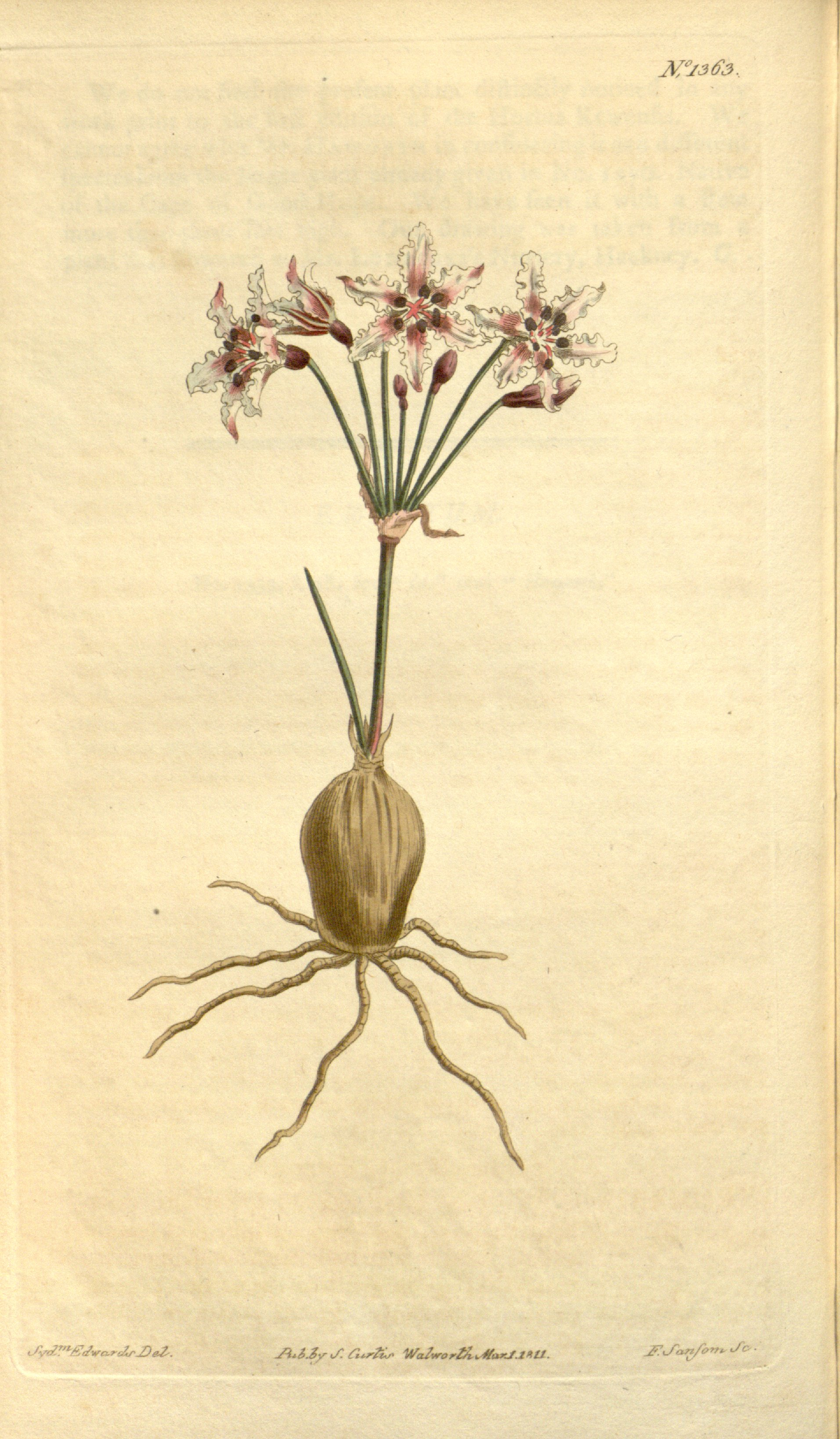

Scientific classification
- Kingdom: Plantae
- Clade: Tracheophytes
- Clade: Angiosperms
- Clade: Monocots
- Order: Asparagales
- Family: Amaryllidaceae
- Subfamily: Amaryllidoideae
- Genus: Hessea
- Species: H. cinnamomea

Binomial name
- Hessea cinnamomea (L'Hér.) T.Durand & Schinz

Synonyms
- Amaryllis cinnamomea L'Hér.; Amaryllis crispa Jacq.; Amaryllis pulchella Spreng. ex Kunth; Hessea crispa (Jacq.) Kunth; Imhofia cinnamomea (L'Hér.) M.Roem.; Imhofia crispa (Jacq.) Herb.; Periphanes cinnamomea (L'Hér.) F.M.Leight.; Periphanes crispa (Jacq.) Salisb.; Strumaria crispa (Jacq.) Ker Gawl.

= Hessea cinnamomea =

Species of flowering plant

Hessea cinnamomea, commonly known as the cinnamon hessea or umbrella lily, is a perennial flowering plant and geophyte that belongs to the genus Hessea and is part of the fynbos. The species is endemic to the Western Cape. It occurs in the Cape Peninsula, Riverlands and Joostenberg. It has an area of occurrence of 2400 km² and over the past 140 years has already given up 50% of its habitat to development, especially on the Cape Flats. Invasive plants have also become a threat.
