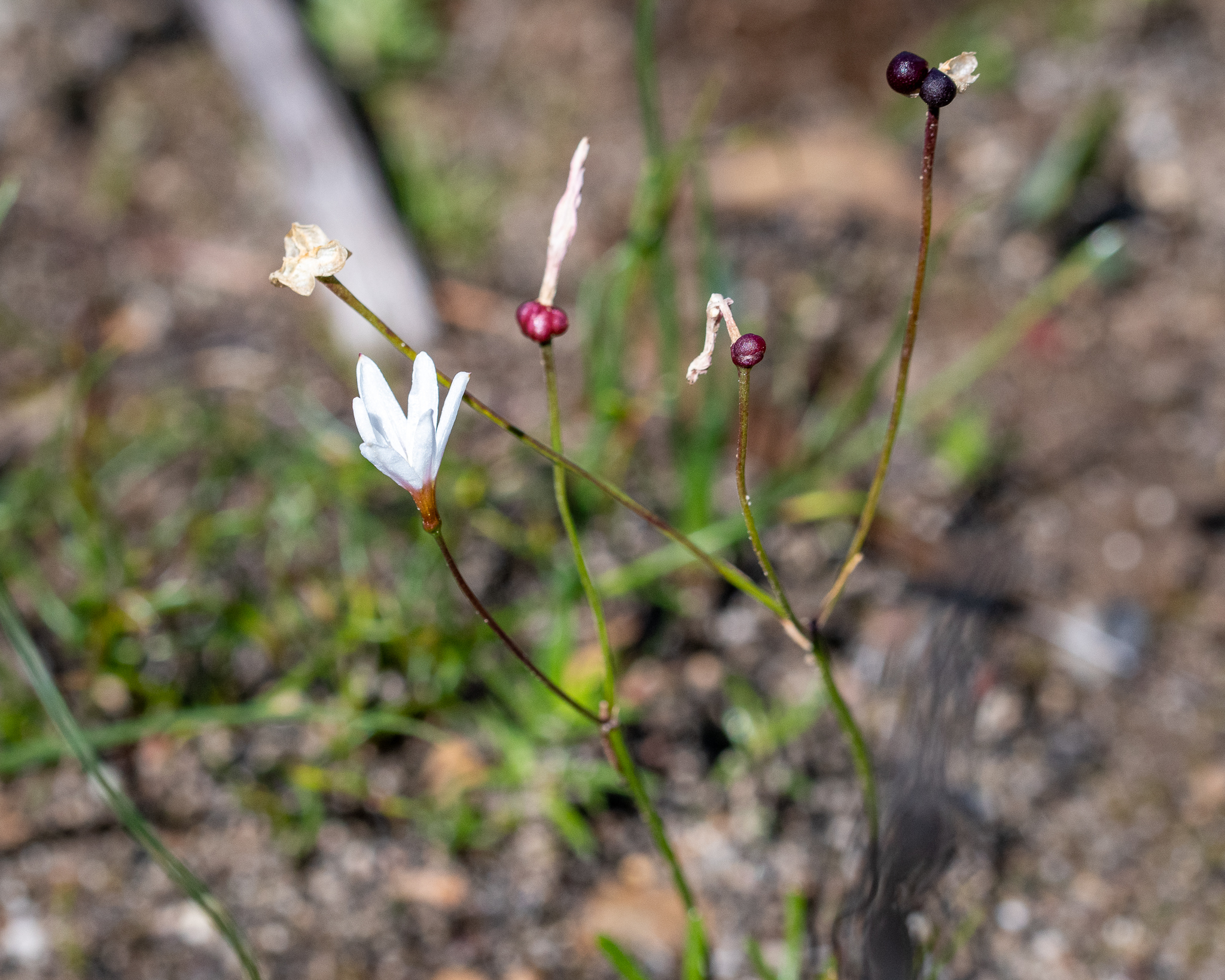

Scientific classification
- Kingdom: Plantae
- Clade: Tracheophytes
- Clade: Angiosperms
- Clade: Monocots
- Order: Asparagales
- Family: Amaryllidaceae
- Subfamily: Amaryllidoideae
- Genus: Strumaria
- Species: S. spiralis

Binomial name
- Strumaria spiralis (L'Hér.) W.T.Aiton

= Strumaria spiralis =

Species of flowering plant

Strumaria spiralis is a species of flowering plant belonging to the family Amaryllidaceae.

Its native range is the southwestern Cape Provinces of South Africa.
