= Hessea stellaris =

Scientific classification
- Kingdom: Plantae
- Clade: Tracheophytes
- Clade: Angiosperms
- Clade: Monocots
- Order: Asparagales
- Family: Amaryllidaceae
- Subfamily: Amaryllidoideae
- Genus: Hessea
- Species: H. stellaris

Binomial name
- Hessea stellaris (Herb.)

Synonyms
- Amaryllis stellaris Jacq.; Carpolyza stellaris (Jacq.) Heynh.; Hessea cinnabarina D.Müll.-Doblies & U.Müll.-Doblies; Hessea schlechteri Kuntze; Hessea weberlingiorum D.Müll.-Doblies & U.Müll.-Doblies; Periphanes stellaris (Jacq.) Salisb.; Strumaria stellaris (Jacq.) Ker Gawl.

Species of flowering plant

Hessea stellaris, commonly known as the star sambreeltjie, is a perennial flowering plant and geophyte belonging to the genus Hessea. The species is endemic to the Northern Cape and the Western Cape.
