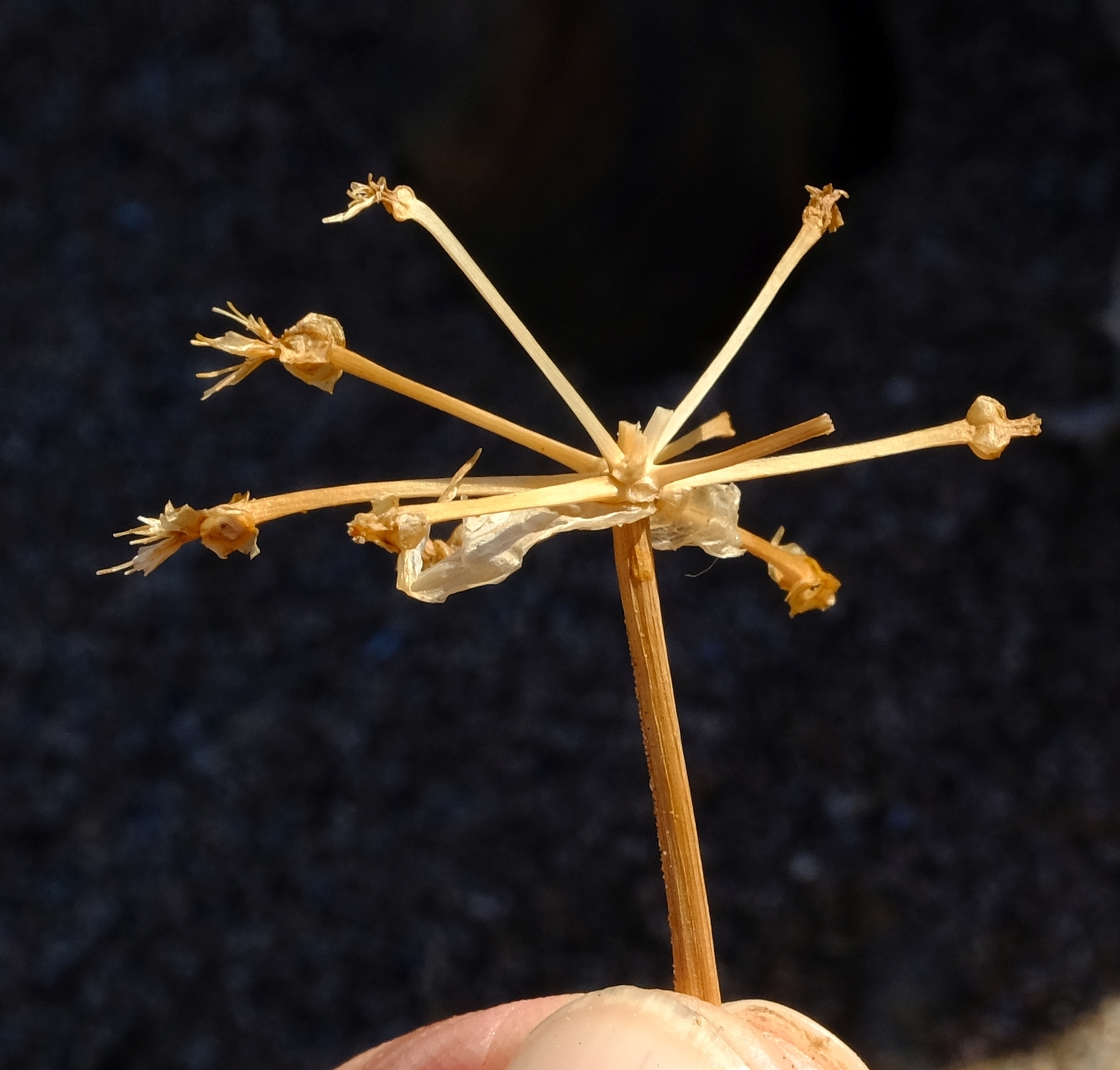

Scientific classification
- Kingdom: Plantae
- Clade: Embryophytes
- Clade: Tracheophytes
- Clade: Angiosperms
- Clade: Monocots
- Order: Asparagales
- Family: Amaryllidaceae
- Subfamily: Amaryllidoideae
- Genus: Namaquanula
- Species: N. bruce-bayeri

Binomial name
- Namaquanula bruce-bayeri D.Müll.-Doblies & U.Müll.-Doblies

Synonyms
- Namaquanula etesionamibensis D.Müll.-Doblies & U.Müll.-Doblies

= Namaquanula bruce-bayeri =

Species of flowering plant

Namaquanula bruce-bayeri, commonly known as the common Namiblily, is a rare bulbous plant belonging to the family Amaryllidaceae. It is native to the arid regions of southwestern Namibia and the Northern Cape province of South Africa, particularly within the Richtersveld.
