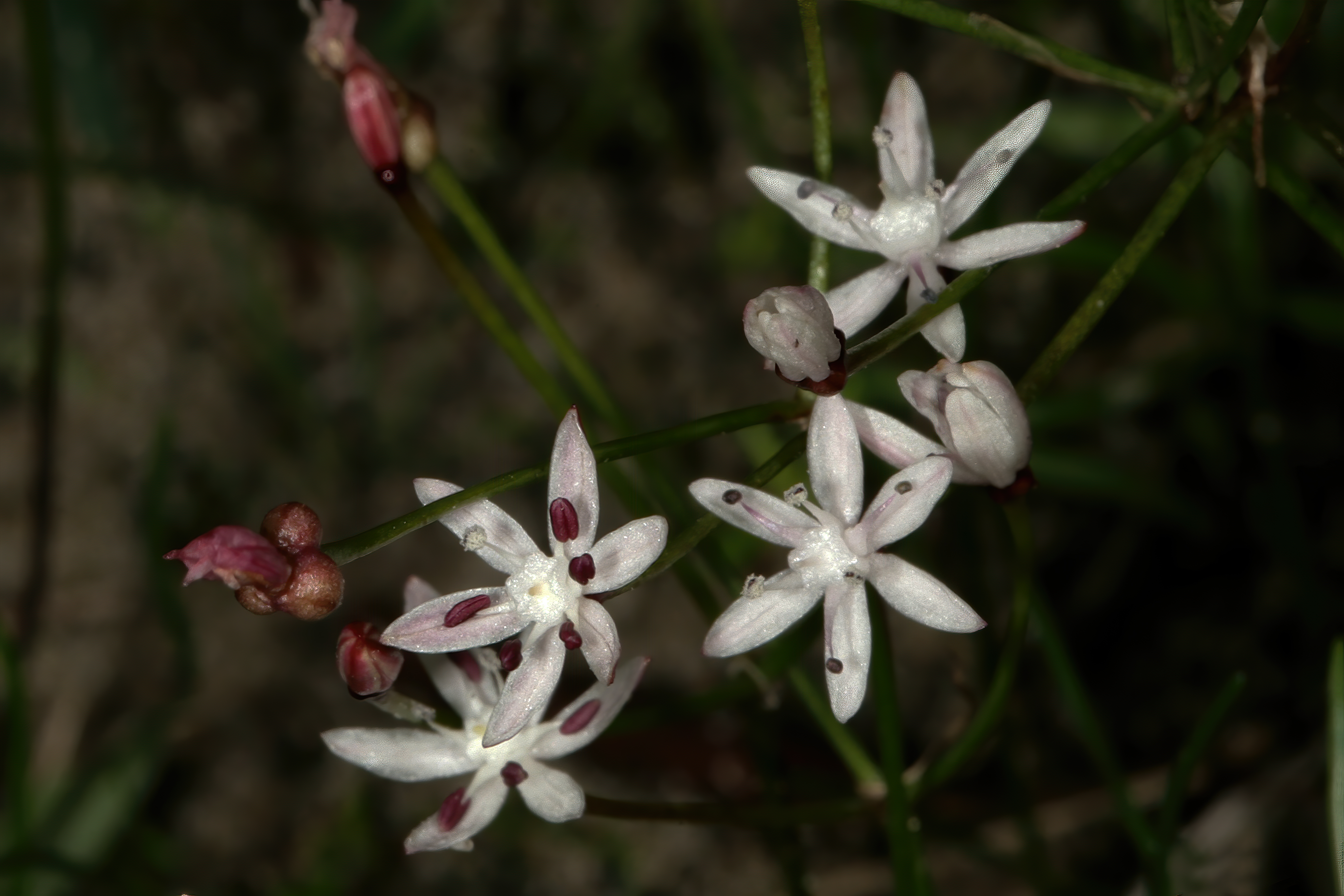
- Strumaria tenella subsp. tenella

Scientific classification
- Kingdom: Plantae
- Clade: Tracheophytes
- Clade: Angiosperms
- Clade: Monocots
- Order: Asparagales
- Family: Amaryllidaceae
- Subfamily: Amaryllidoideae
- Genus: Strumaria
- Species: S. tenella

Binomial name
- Strumaria tenella (L.f.) Snijman

Synonyms
- Carpolyza tenella (L.f.) F.M.Leight.; Crinum tenellum L.f.; Hessea tenella (L.f.) Oberm.; Imhofia tenella (L.f.) M.Roem.; Tedingea tenella (L.f.) D.Müll.-Doblies & U.Müll.-Doblies

= Strumaria tenella =

Species of flowering plant

Strumaria tenella is a species of flowering plant in the family Amaryllidaceae, native to Lesotho, and the Cape Provinces and Free State of South Africa. It was first described by Carl Linnaeus the Younger in 1782 as Crinum tenellum. Its inflorescence of white flowers has been described as "noticeably starry".

== Subspecies ==
Two subspecies are recognized:

- Strumaria tenella subsp. orientalis Snijman is the only Strumaria taxon from the summer rainfall area in the east of southern Africa – all the others, including subsp. tenella, are from the more western winter rainfall area. It has a larger swelling at the base of the style than subsp. tenella.
- Strumaria tenella subsp. tenella
