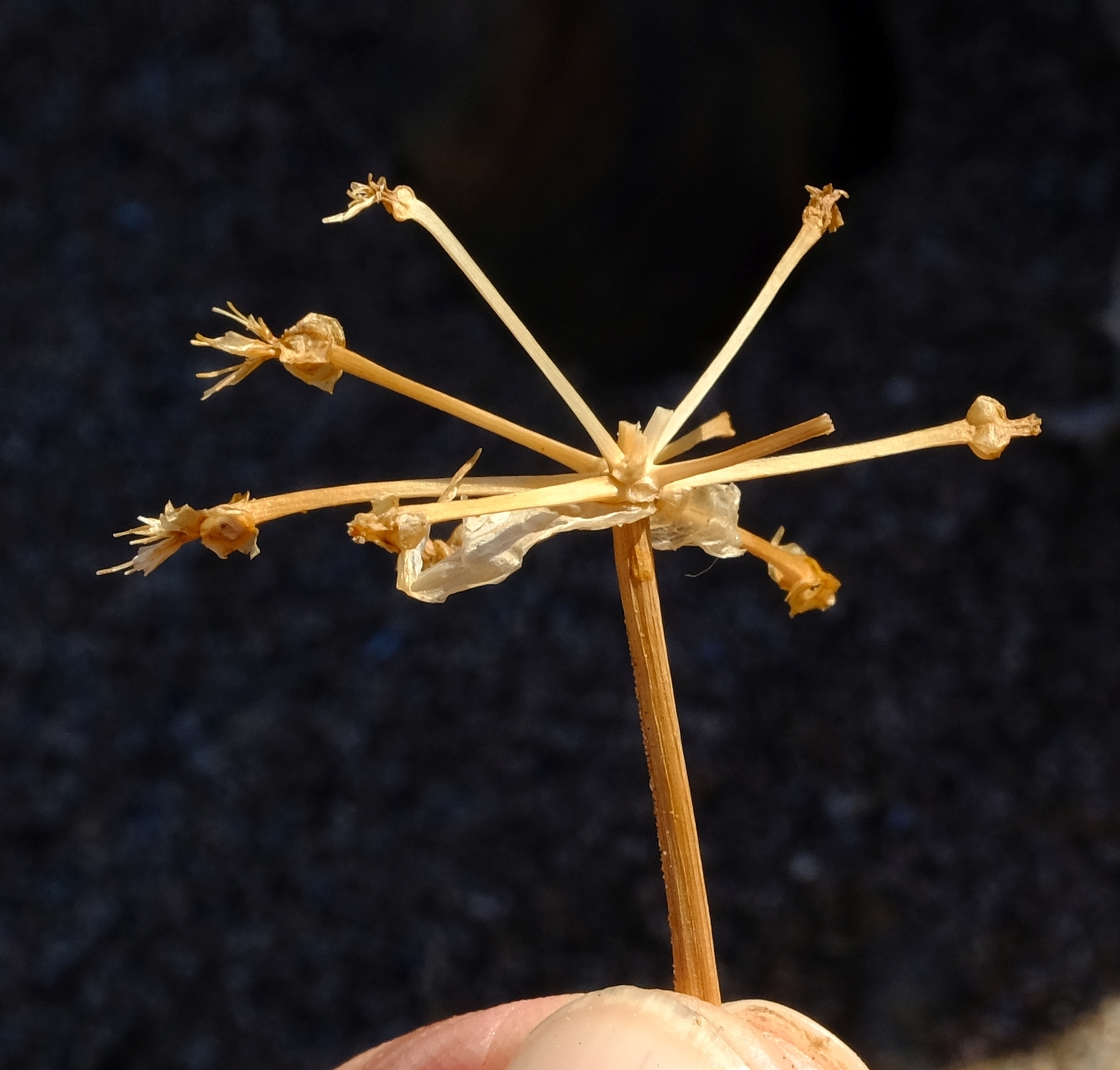
- Namaquanula bruce-bayeri

Scientific classification
- Kingdom: Plantae
- Clade: Tracheophytes
- Clade: Angiosperms
- Clade: Monocots
- Order: Asparagales
- Family: Amaryllidaceae
- Subfamily: Amaryllidoideae
- Subtribe: Strumariinae
- Genus: Namaquanula; D.Müll.-Doblies & U. Müll.-Doblies

Type species
- Namaquanula bruce-bayeri D.Müll.-Doblies & U. Müll.-Doblies
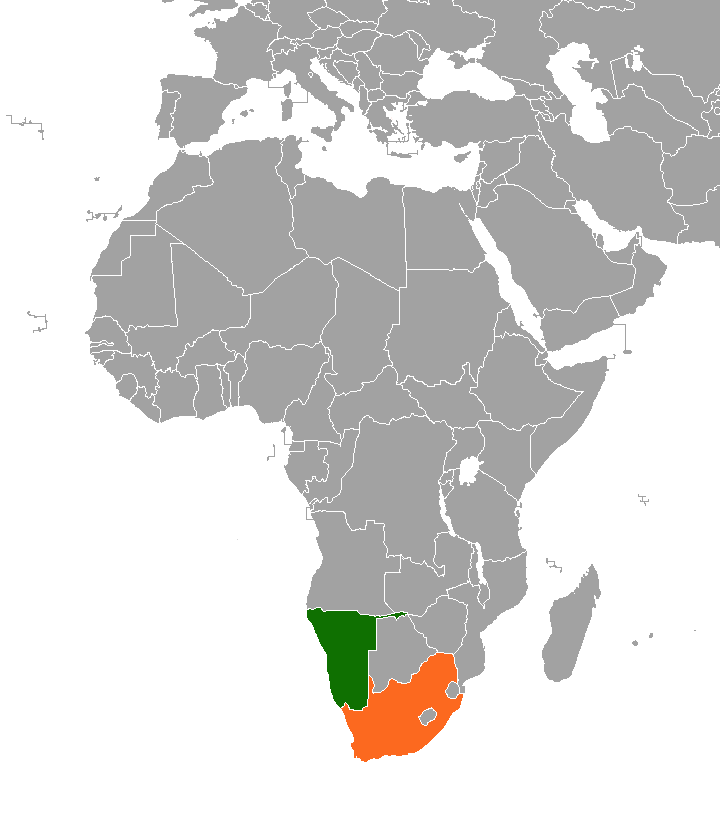
- It is native to South Africa and Namibia

= Namaquanula =

Genus of flowering plants

Namaquanula is a plant genus in the Amaryllidaceae, found only in Namibia and the Cape Province of South Africa.

== Description ==
Namaquanula are bulbous, perennial, deciduous herbs with 1–5 leaves.

== Taxonomy ==
It was published by Dietrich Müller-Doblies and Ute Müller-Doblies in 1985 with Namaquanula bruce-bayeri D. Müll.-Doblies & U. Müll.-Doblies as the type species. There are 2 recognized species:

- Namaquanula bruce-bayeri D.Müll.-Doblies & U. Müll.-Doblies - Namibia, Northern Cape Province
- Namaquanula bruynsii Snijman - Namibia
