= Strumaria pygmaea =

Scientific classification
- Kingdom: Plantae
- Clade: Tracheophytes
- Clade: Angiosperms
- Clade: Monocots
- Order: Asparagales
- Family: Amaryllidaceae
- Subfamily: Amaryllidoideae
- Genus: Strumaria
- Species: S. pygmaea

Binomial name
- Strumaria pygmaea Snijman

Synonyms
- Hessea spiralis Baker; Periphanes spiralis F.M.Leight.; Tedingea pygmaea (Snijman) D.Müll.-Doblies & U.Müll.-Doblies; Tedingea spiralis (F.M.Leight.) D.Müll.-Doblies & U.Müll.-Doblies

Species of flowering plant

Strumaria pygmaea is a perennial flowering plant and geophyte belonging to the genus Strumaria and is part of the Succulent Karoo. The species is endemic to the Northern Cape and Western Cape. It occurs on the northern Knersvlakte between Bitterfontein and Nuwerus. The population is stable and the plant is considered rare.
