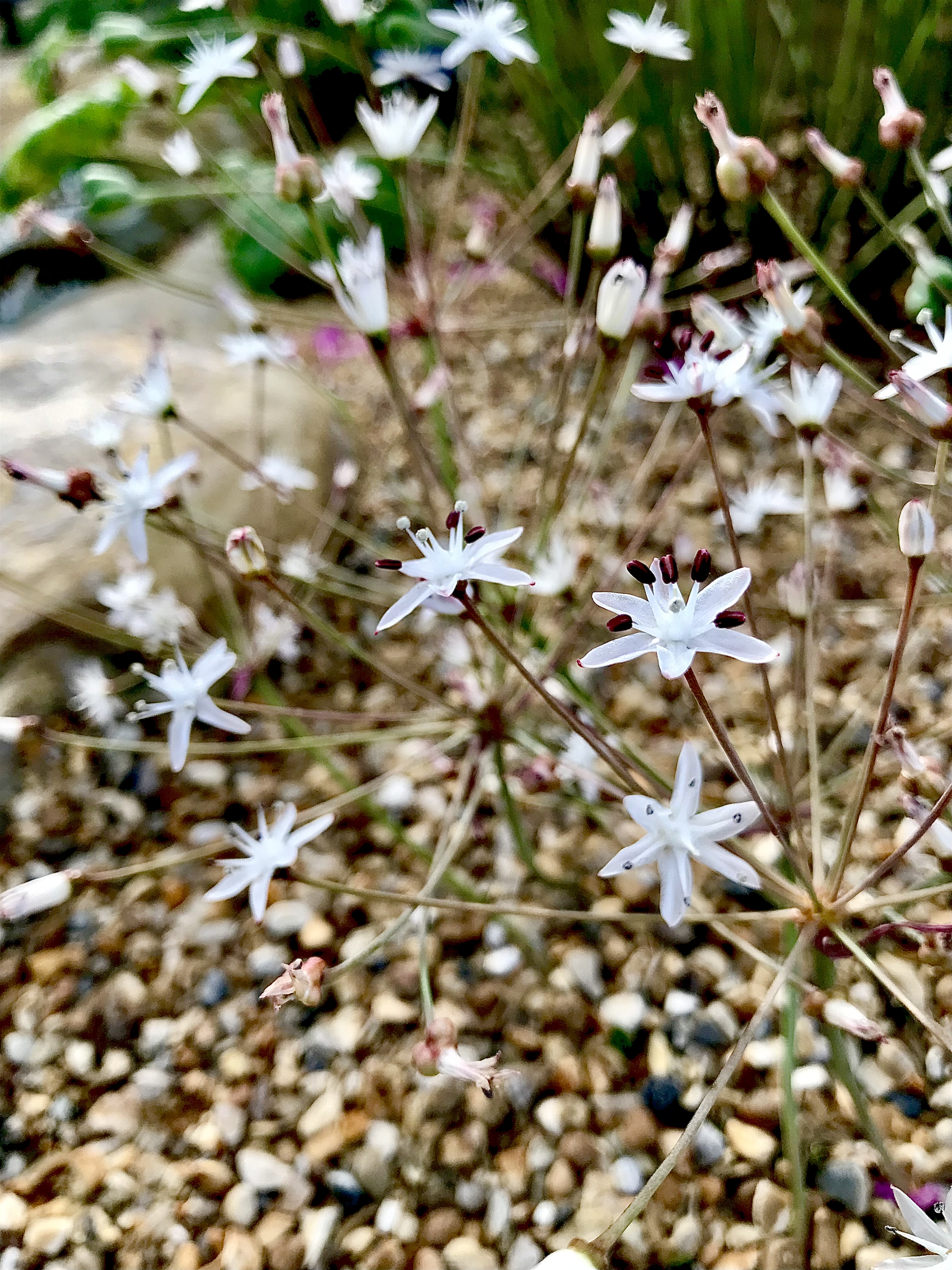
- Strumaria chaplinii, Alpine House, Kew Gardens

Conservation status
- Endangered (IUCN 3.1)

Scientific classification
- Kingdom: Plantae
- Clade: Embryophytes
- Clade: Tracheophytes
- Clade: Spermatophytes
- Clade: Angiosperms
- Clade: Monocots
- Order: Asparagales
- Family: Amaryllidaceae
- Subfamily: Amaryllidoideae
- Genus: Strumaria
- Species: S. chaplinii

Binomial name
- Strumaria chaplinii (W.F.Barker) Snijman

Synonyms
- Gemmaria chaplinii (W.F.Barker) D.Müll.-Doblies & U.Müll.-Doblies; Hessea chaplinii W.F.Barker

= Strumaria chaplinii =

Species of bulbous flowering plant

Strumaria chaplinii is a species of bulbous flowering plant in the family Amaryllidaceae, native to south-west Cape Provinces. It was first described in 1944 as Hessea chaplinii.

== Description ==
Strumaria chaplinii is a very small plant. The upper leaf surfaces are hairy. The flowers are star-shaped, with tepals that have flat faces, unlike similar species such as Strumaria discifera. Like other species of Strumaria, the flowers are borne in an umbel on long pedicels.

== Taxonomy ==
The species was first described as Hessea chaplinii in 1944 by Winsome Fanny Barker. It was transferred to Strumaria in 1994.

== Distribution and habitat ==
Strumaria chaplinii is native to the south-west Cape Provinces of South Africa. It grows in moist pockets at the base of granite rocks in coastal fynbos.

== Gallery ==
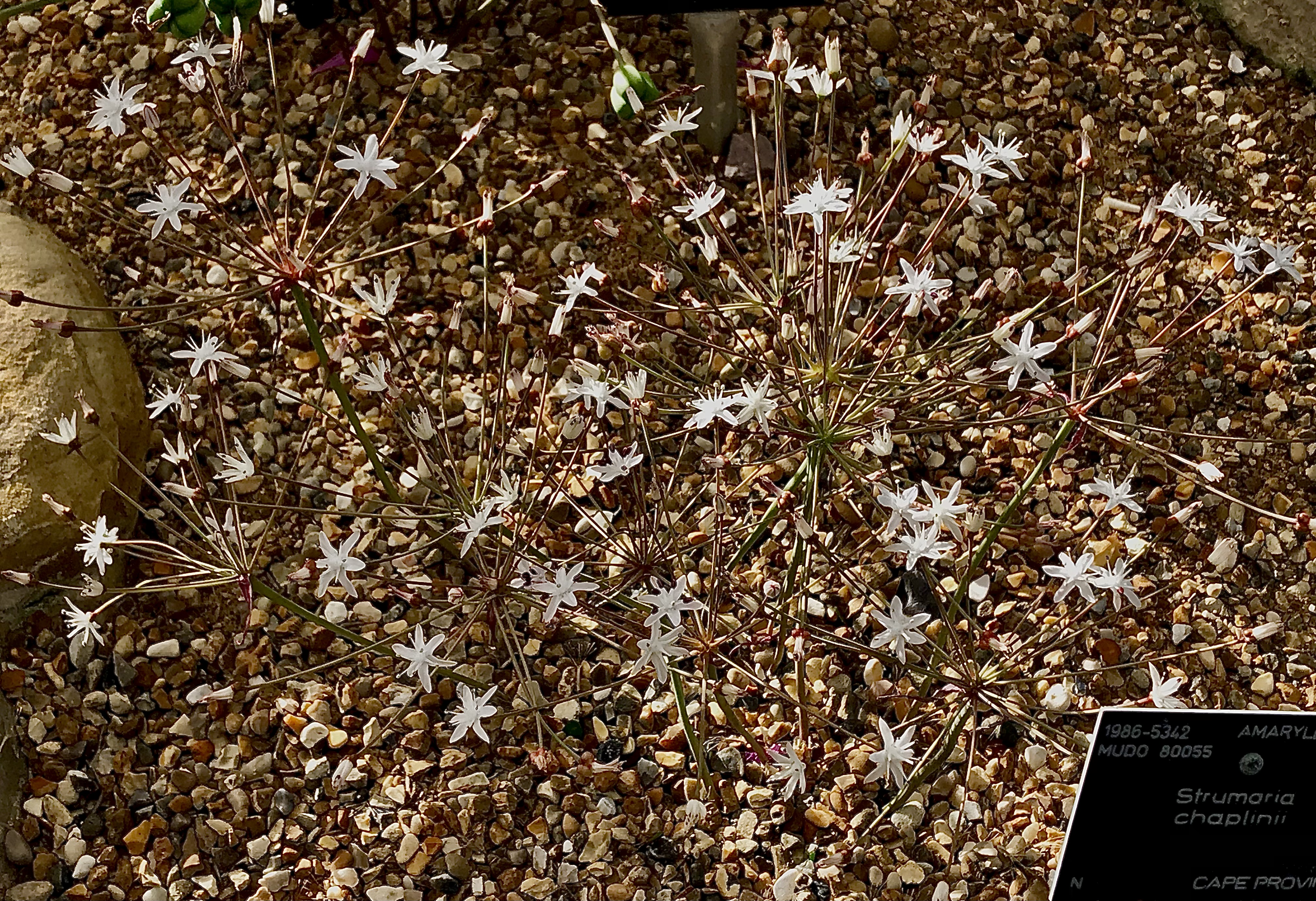
Strumaria chaplinii flowering in Davies Alpine House, Kew

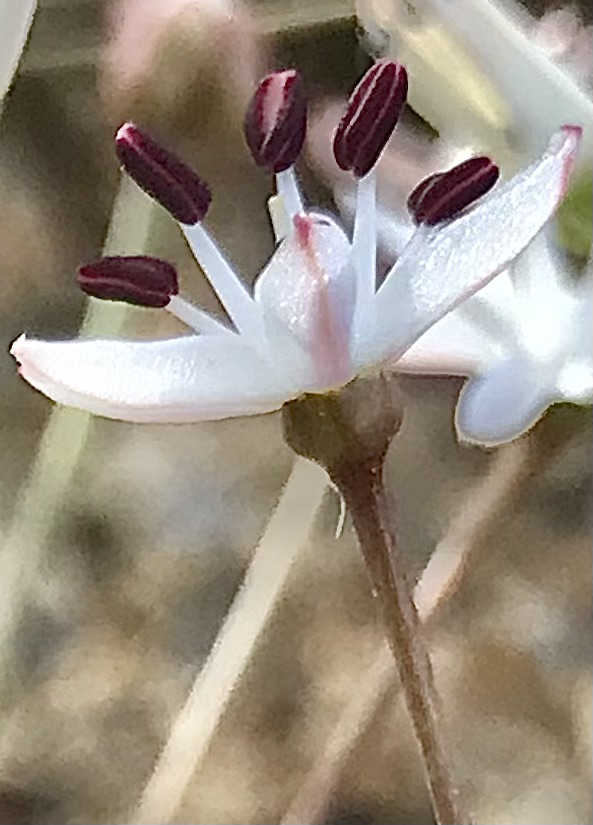
Single flower (enlarged) in profile

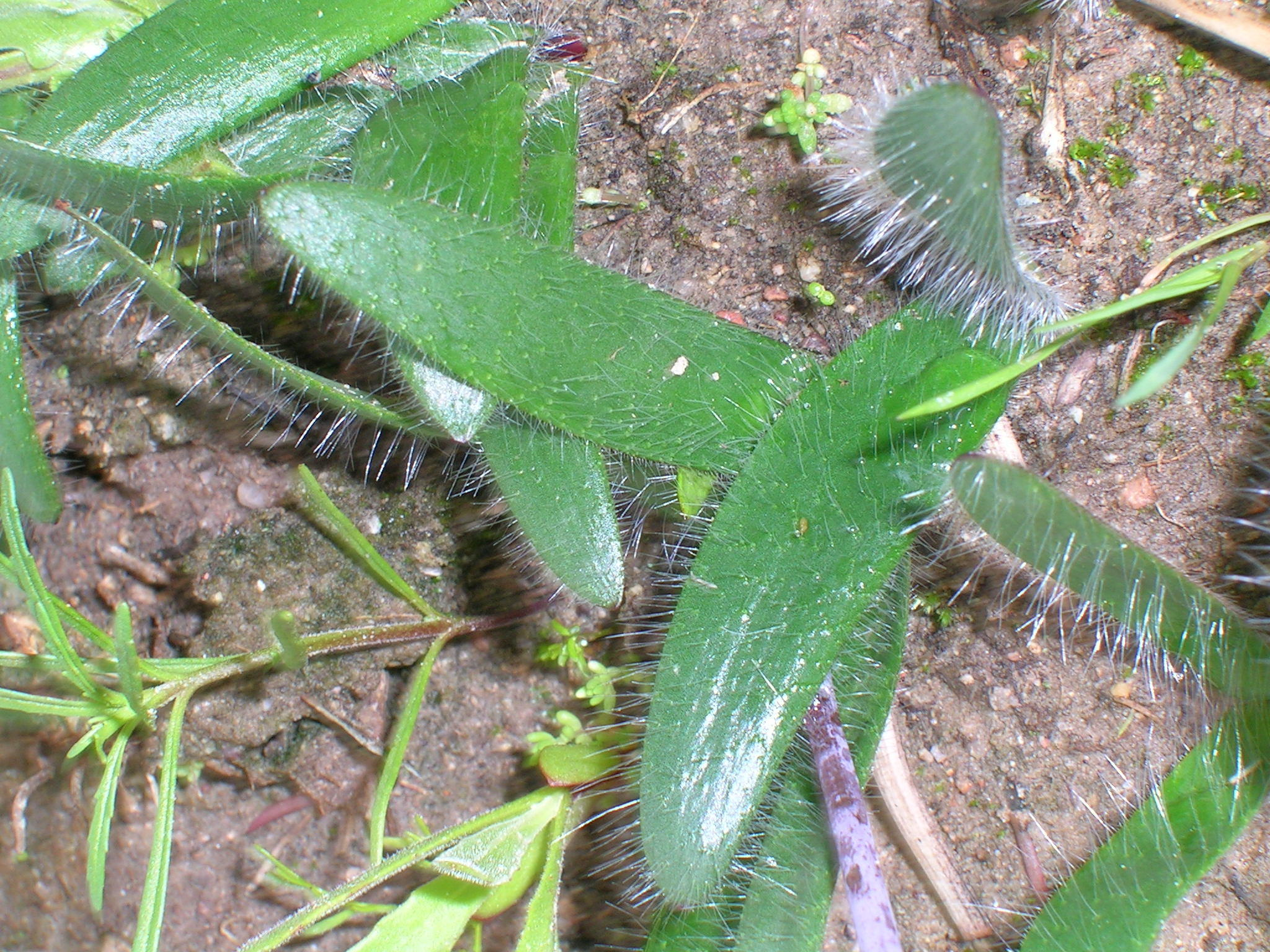
Villous foliage
