= Strumaria barbarae =

Conservation status
- Least Concern (IUCN 3.1)

Scientific classification
- Kingdom: Plantae
- Clade: Tracheophytes
- Clade: Angiosperms
- Clade: Monocots
- Order: Asparagales
- Family: Amaryllidaceae
- Subfamily: Amaryllidoideae
- Genus: Strumaria
- Species: S. barbarae

Binomial name
- Strumaria barbarae Oberm.

Species of flowering plant

Strumaria barbarae is a species of plant native to Namibia and to Cape Province in South Africa. Its natural habitat is rocky areas.
