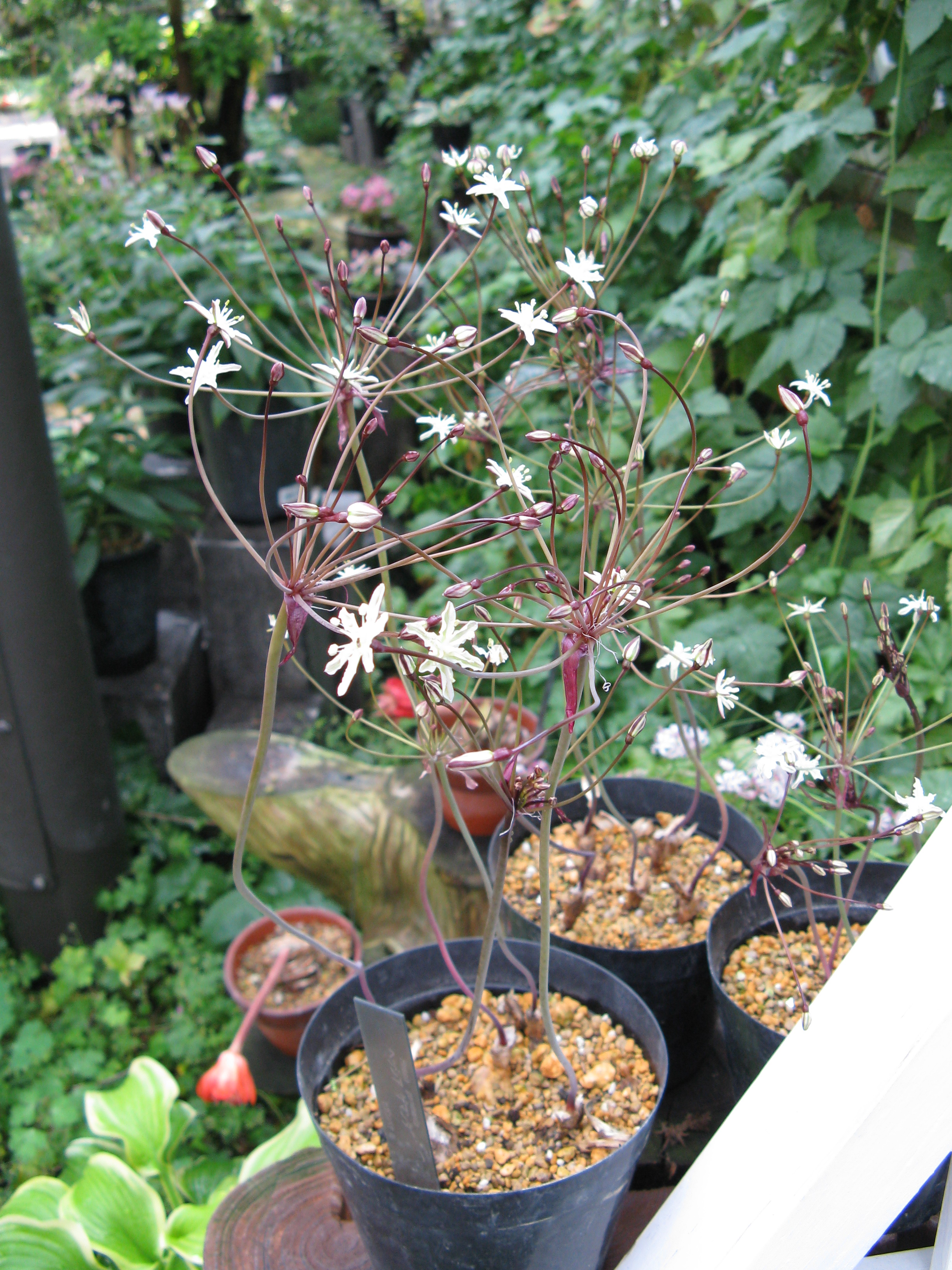
- In cultivation in Japan

Scientific classification
- Kingdom: Plantae
- Clade: Tracheophytes
- Clade: Angiosperms
- Clade: Monocots
- Order: Asparagales
- Family: Amaryllidaceae
- Subfamily: Amaryllidoideae
- Genus: Strumaria
- Species: S. gemmata

Binomial name
- Strumaria gemmata Ker Gawl.

Synonyms
- Gemmaria gemmata (Ker Gawl.) Salisb. ex D.Müll.-Doblies & U.Müll.-Doblies; Hessea burchelliana (Herb.) Benth. & Hook.f.; Hessea gemmata (Ker Gawl.) Benth. & Hook.f.; Imhofia bergiana Kunth; Imhofia burchelliana Herb.; Imhofia gemmata (Ker Gawl.) Herb.; Periphanes gemmata (Ker Gawl.) F.M.Leight.; Strumaria undulata P.J.Bergius ex Kunth

= Strumaria gemmata =

Species of flowering plant

Strumaria gemmata is a species of flowering plant in the family Amaryllidaceae, native to the Cape Provinces and the Free State of South Africa. It was first described by John Bellenden Ker Gawler in 1814.

== Description ==
Members of the genus Strumaria have flowers in umbels, typically on long pedicels. Strumaria gemmata is the only species in the genus with yellowish flowers (the others have white or in a few cases pink flowers). The colour is mainly on the midrib of the tepals, which are channelled and have wavy (crisped) edges.

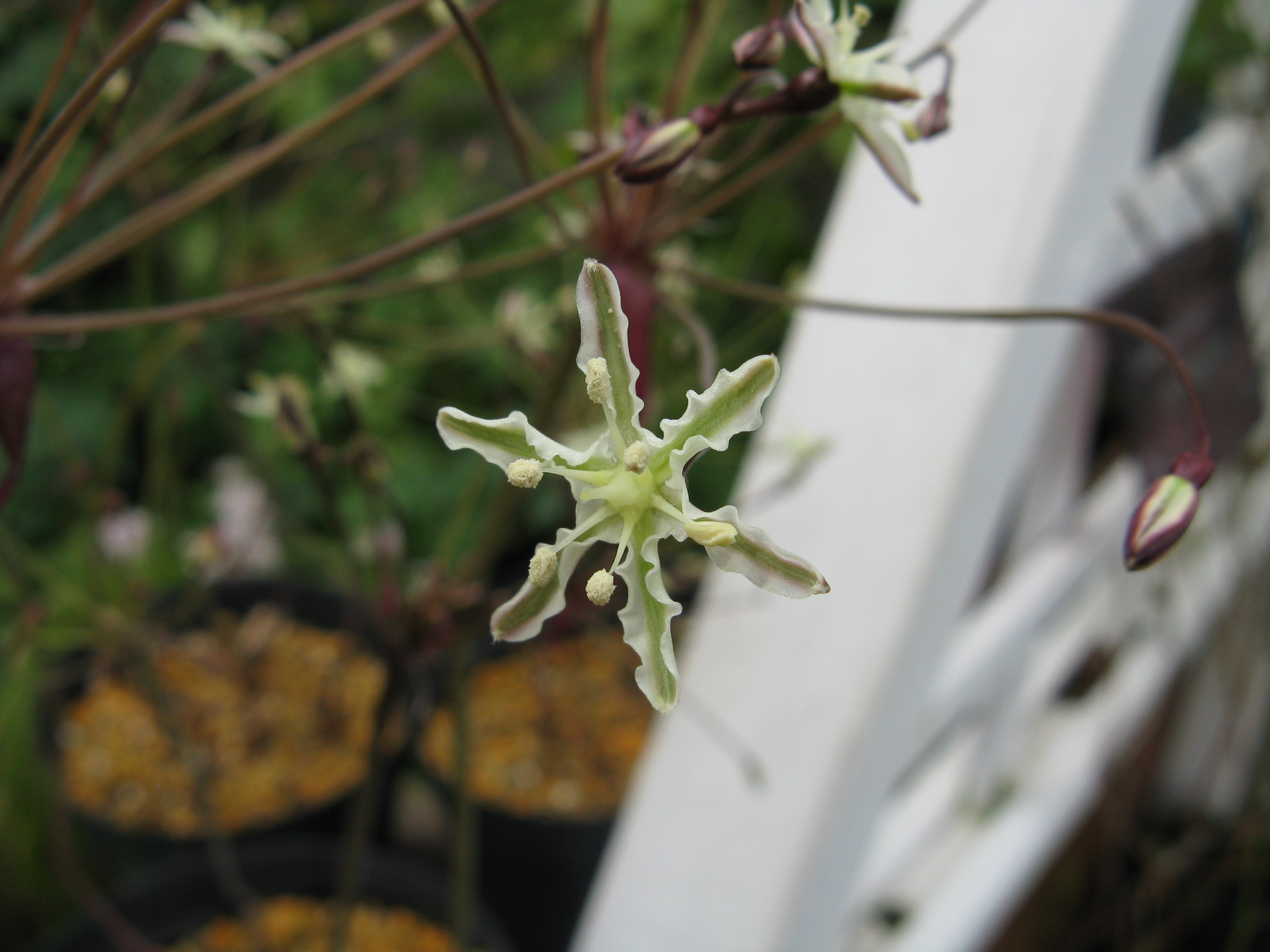
Close up of flower

== Distribution and habitat ==
Strumaria gemmata is native to semi-arid areas of the Cape Provinces and the Free State of South Africa.
