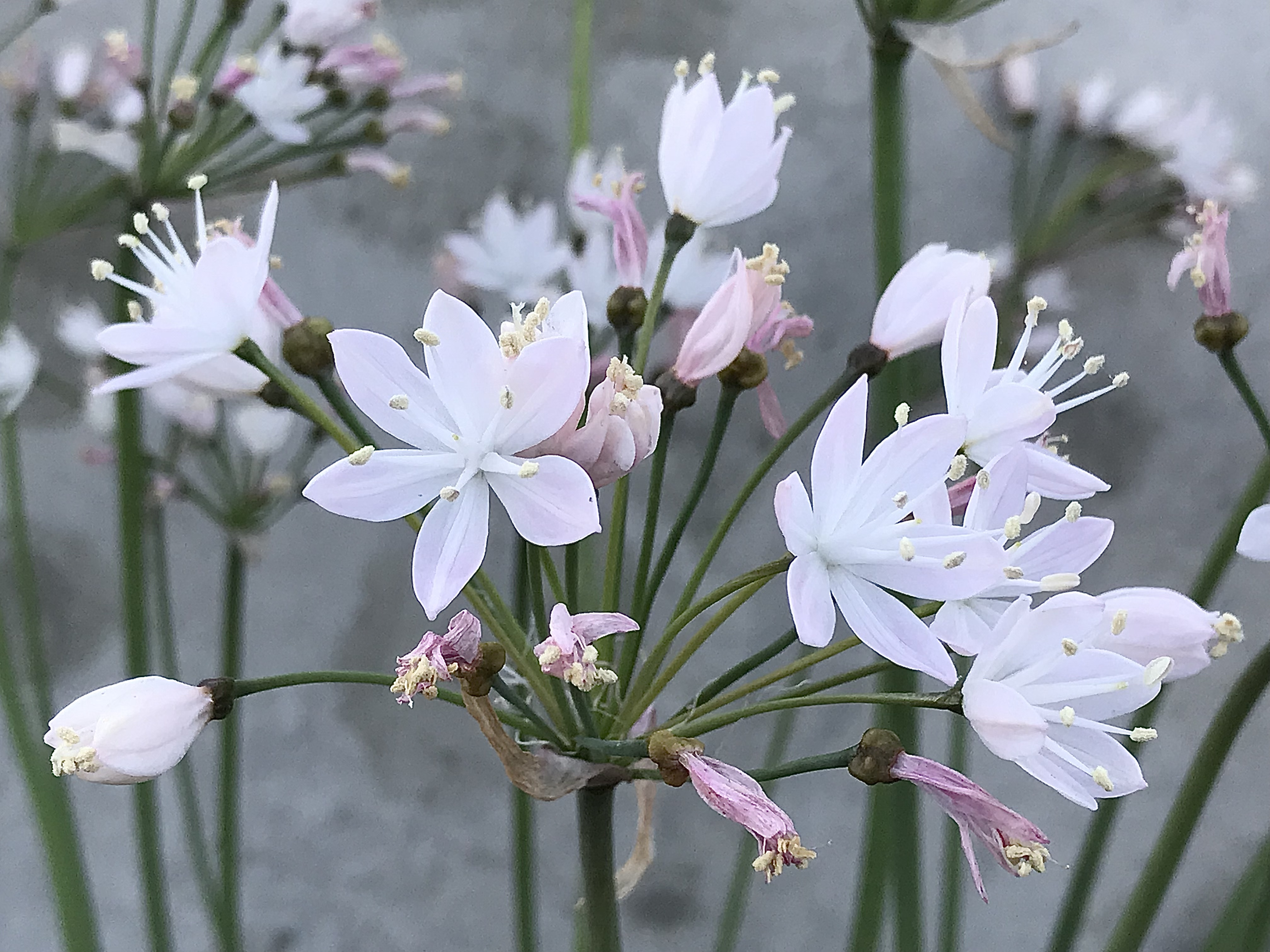

Scientific classification
- Kingdom: Plantae
- Clade: Tracheophytes
- Clade: Angiosperms
- Clade: Monocots
- Order: Asparagales
- Family: Amaryllidaceae
- Subfamily: Amaryllidoideae
- Genus: Strumaria
- Species: S. truncata

Binomial name
- Strumaria truncata Jacq..

Synonyms
- Amaryllis vaginata (Thunb.) D.Dietr.; Brunsvigia vaginata (Thunb.) Schult. & Schult.f.; Haemanthus vaginatus Thunb.; Hessea vaginata (Thunb.) Herb.; Hymenetron linguiflora Salisb.; Hymenetron truncata (Jacq.) Salisb.; Pugionella angustifolia (Jacq.) Salisb.; Strumaria angustifolia Jacq.; Strumaria baueriana Herb.; Strumaria linguifolia Jacq.; Strumaria rubella Jacq.; Stylago rubella (Jacq.) Salisb.

= Strumaria truncata =

Species of flowering plant

Strumaria truncata (English common name: Namaqualand snowflake) is a species of flowering plant in the family Amaryllidaceae, native to the Cape Provinces of South Africa. It is widely distributed in the northwest of the Cape Provinces, and the most common of the Strumaria species found there. It forms small clumps of bulbs which produce twisted leaves. Its flowers, which are sometimes pendulous, vary in colour from white to deep pink. The pink forms were once treated as a separate species, Strumaria rubella, and have also been called var. rubella. The species was first described by Nikolaus Joseph von Jacquin in 1792.

== Gallery ==
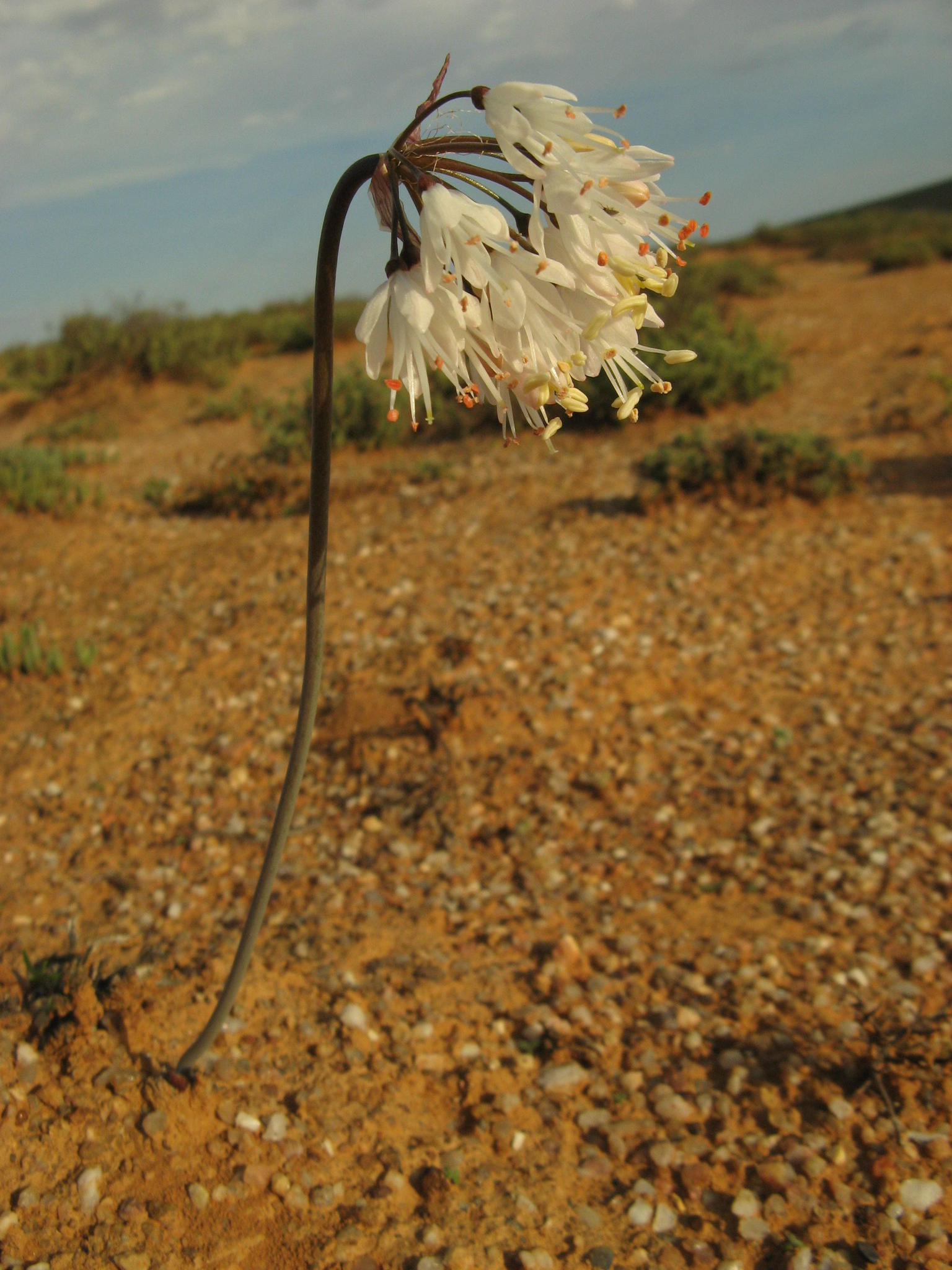
Wild specimen of white-flowered variety with nodding inflorescence, Knersvlakte Nature Reserve

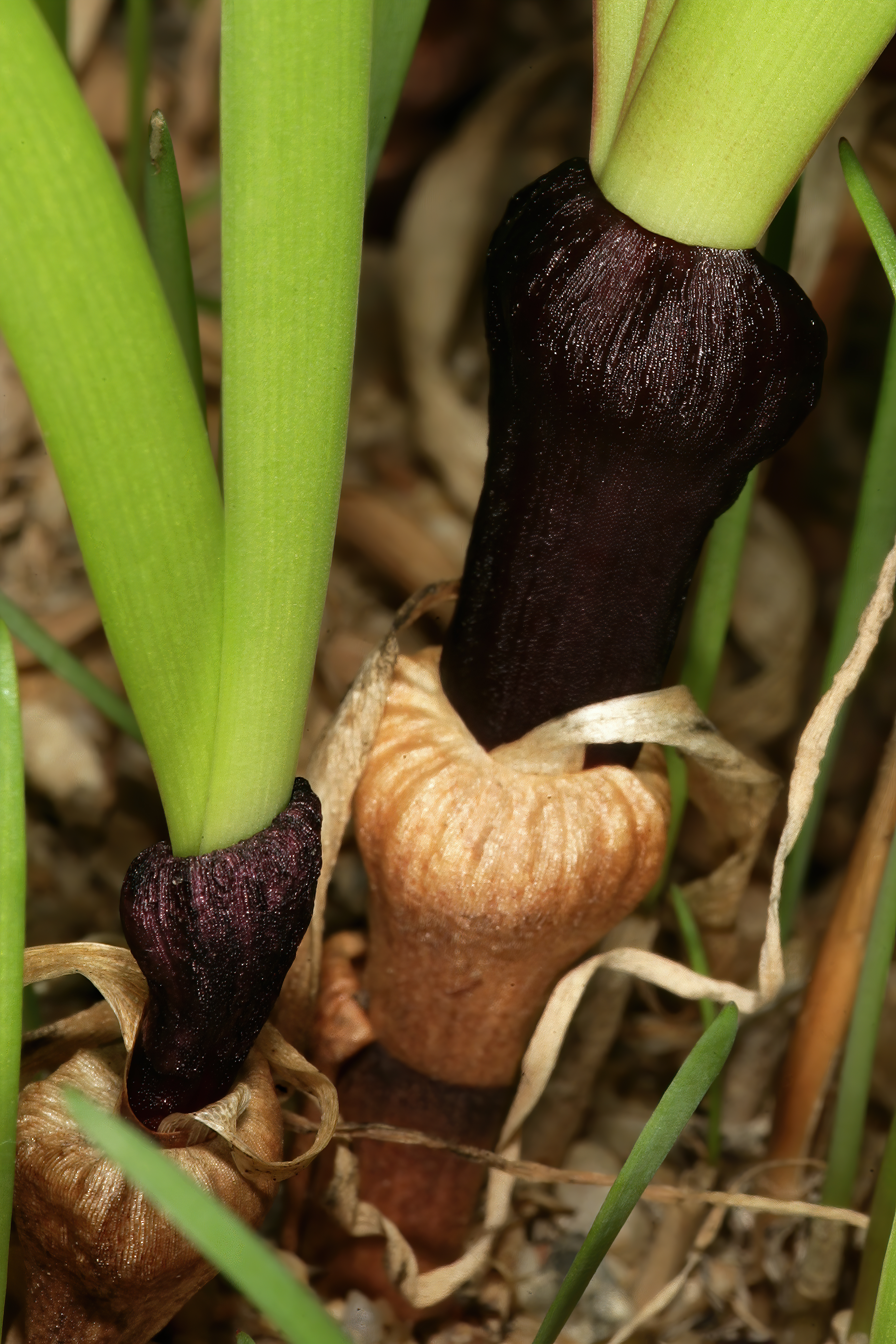
Lower portion of plants, showing two bicoloured, inflated, collar-like basal sheaths

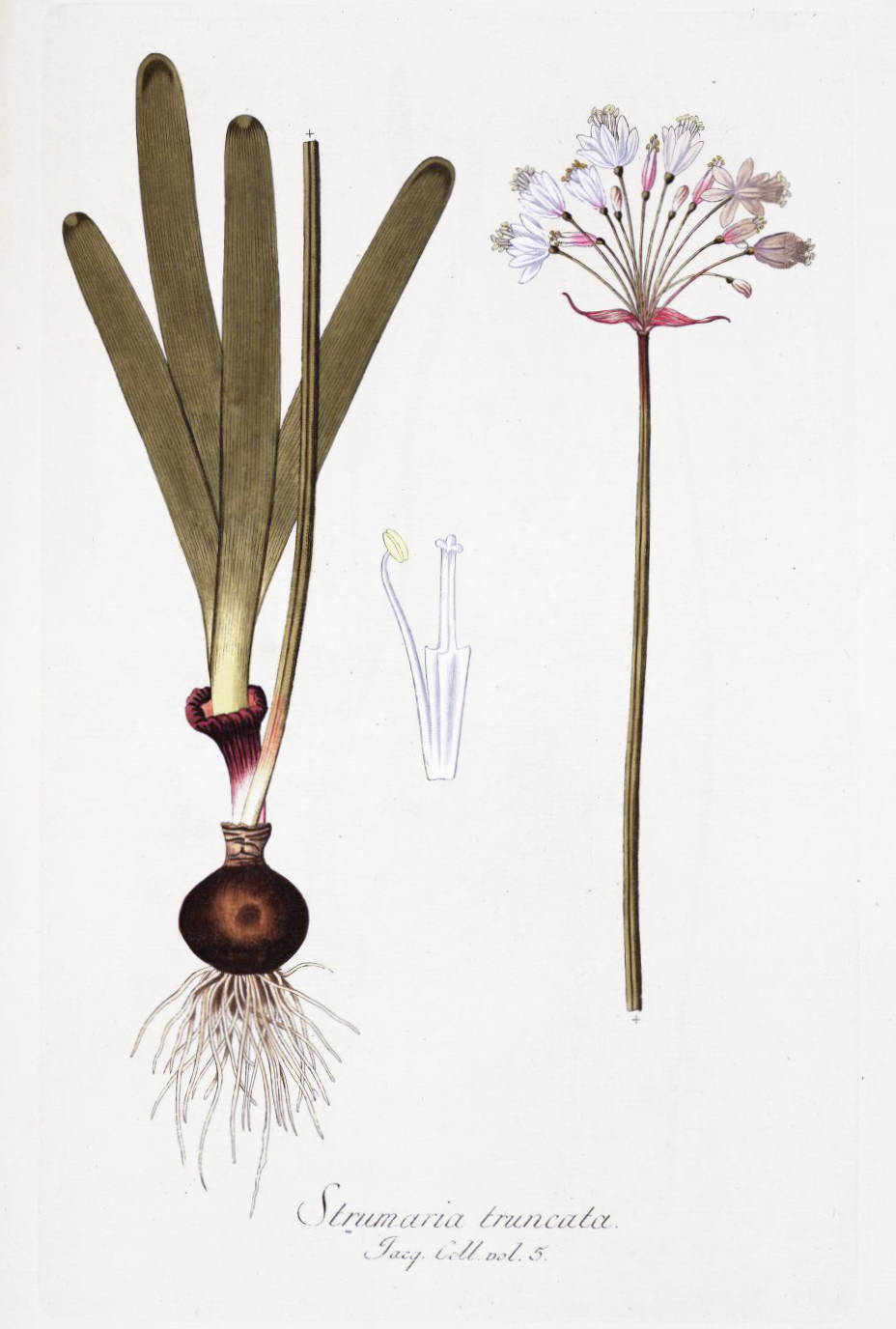
Illustration from von Jacquin's Icones plantarum rariorum (Vol. 2, Plate 357, 1792)
