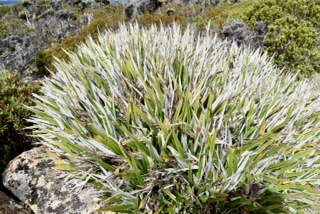
- Astelia alpina at the summit of Mount Wellington

Scientific classification
- Kingdom: Plantae
- Clade: Tracheophytes
- Clade: Angiosperms
- Clade: Monocots
- Order: Asparagales
- Family: Asteliaceae
- Genus: Astelia
- Species: A. alpina

Binomial name
- Astelia alpina R.Br.

= Astelia alpina =

Species of flowering plant

Astelia alpina called pineapple grass, silver astelia, or perching lily is a commonly found species in alpine and subalpine areas of Tasmania and the Australian Alps. It is a perennial herb that typically dominates its environment by growing in dense clusters, called mats, in alpine bogs. There are two subspecies: Astelia alpina var. novae hollandiae from New South Wales and Victoria and Astelia alpina var. alpina endemic to Tasmania. Both subspecies appear very similar to each other. The species was originally described by Robert Brown.

== Description ==
Pineapple grass has green leaves with silvery, hairy undersides, appearing similar to the vegetative leaves of a pineapple plant. The leaves are up to 30 cm long, 2–3 cm wide, tapering to a point at the end. Leaves are stiff and have recurved margins. The lower surface is covered with many fine white hairs, called trichomes, while the upper surface is green with the occasional hair. When viewed under the microscope, each trichome has a base of two glandular cells that stains dark. Flowers are small and white-green. When present at the base of the leaves, fruits are red ovals about 12 mm long, fleshy, and edible. The male panicle has 10–60 flowers, while the female panicle has a maximum of 30 flowers.

== Taxonomy ==
The word Astelia comes from Greek, where "a" means without and "stele" means trunk, referring to the very small stem and style. Alpinus comes from Latin, in reference to its preferred habitat. It is normally known as pineapple grass because its vegetative growth looks like pineapple leaves, but has also been called silver astelia, perching lily, and very rarely, artichoke.

Despite its common name, pineapple grass is not a grass, and is more closely related to the lilies. Based on the current taxonomy for Asteliaceae, Astelia alpina's closest relatives include A. subulata, A. solandri, A. grandis, A. nervosa, A. chathamica, and A. fragrans. More recent genetic studies, however, indicate that the current taxonomy is not monophyletic, and reclassification is required. This classification suggests that A. alpina var. alpina is as closely related to A. alpina var. novaehollandiae as it is to A. papuana, A. linearis var. linearis, A. subulata, and A. linearis var. novae-zelandiae. It is also closely related to A. hemichrysa, but a major branch point exists separating it from the other species of Astelia.

== Reproduction ==
Flowers appear on pineapple grass in summer on structures called racemes. This species is dioecious, meaning that male and female flowers are found in different plants. Like other species of Astelia, which grow in areas that are moist and humid, the ovary is full of mucilage, which is thought to function in pollen transmittance. Humans can facilitate asexual reproduction by breaking apart mature clumps and planting them separately. Males produce more flowers and inflorescences than females.

== Distribution and habitat ==
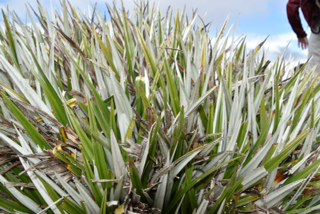
Astelia alpina at the summit of Mount Wellington, Tasmania

Pineapple grass is commonly found in the subalpine and alpine areas of Tasmania and the Australian Alps. In these habitats, plants must be tough to survive the harsh wind exposure, hot sun in summer, and freezing in winter. The Tasmanian species typically dominates alpine sedgeland and is found on all mountains in Tasmania. It prefers moist soils, and often occurs together with the coral fern (Gleichenia alpina), and other alpine plants including Empodisma minus, Carpha alpina, and Restio australis.

== Ecology ==
Astelia alpina is often a pioneer species following fires in alpine areas. Alpine herbland and sedgeland are typically dominated by Astelia alpina 10–20 years after a fire, a community that generally replaces deciduous and coniferous heath. Western alpine sedgeland in Tasmania is less dependent on fire to exist than sedgelands in eastern Tasmania. It has a variable form and dominance depending on location and habitat (Table 1).

Table 1: Description of vegetative coverage by Pineapple Grass, Astelia alpina, in different locations. Different locations display different form and dominance patterns.

Location	Elevation above sea level	Description of vegetation	Dominance of vegetation
Wombat Moor, Mt Field National Park, Tasmania	1070m	Robust clumps of pineapple grass growing to 60 cm tall.	Shares dominance with the coral fern, Gleichenia alpina, with about 40% coverage of pineapple grass.
Hansons Peak, Cradle Mountain National Park, Tasmania	1185m	Sparse clumps of pineapple grass growing to 15 cm tall.	Pineapple grass is not dominant here - the coral fern dominates with a number of members of the family Ericaceae interspersed. About 10% coverage of pineapple grass.
Ladies Tarn, Mt Hartz National Park, Tasmania	979m	Thick clumps of pineapple grass growing to 40 cm tall.	Pineapple grass has about 30% coverage here, combined with coral fern and other high elevation shrubs.

== Conservation ==
This species is not considered to be at risk in the wild. The community it dominates, alpine sedgeland, is classified as Highland Treeless Vegetation, which is most threatened by fires, and pressures associated with bushwalkers.

== Uses and cultivation ==
Pineapple grass is not widely cultivated, but the berries are edible. It prefers high altitude conditions with wet soil and plenty of light. If it is being grown at low altitudes, it is more suited to colder climates. Seed collection from native plants is possible. The 1889 book The Useful Native Plants of Australia records that "The fruit is sweet, and the bases of the leaves are eaten".
