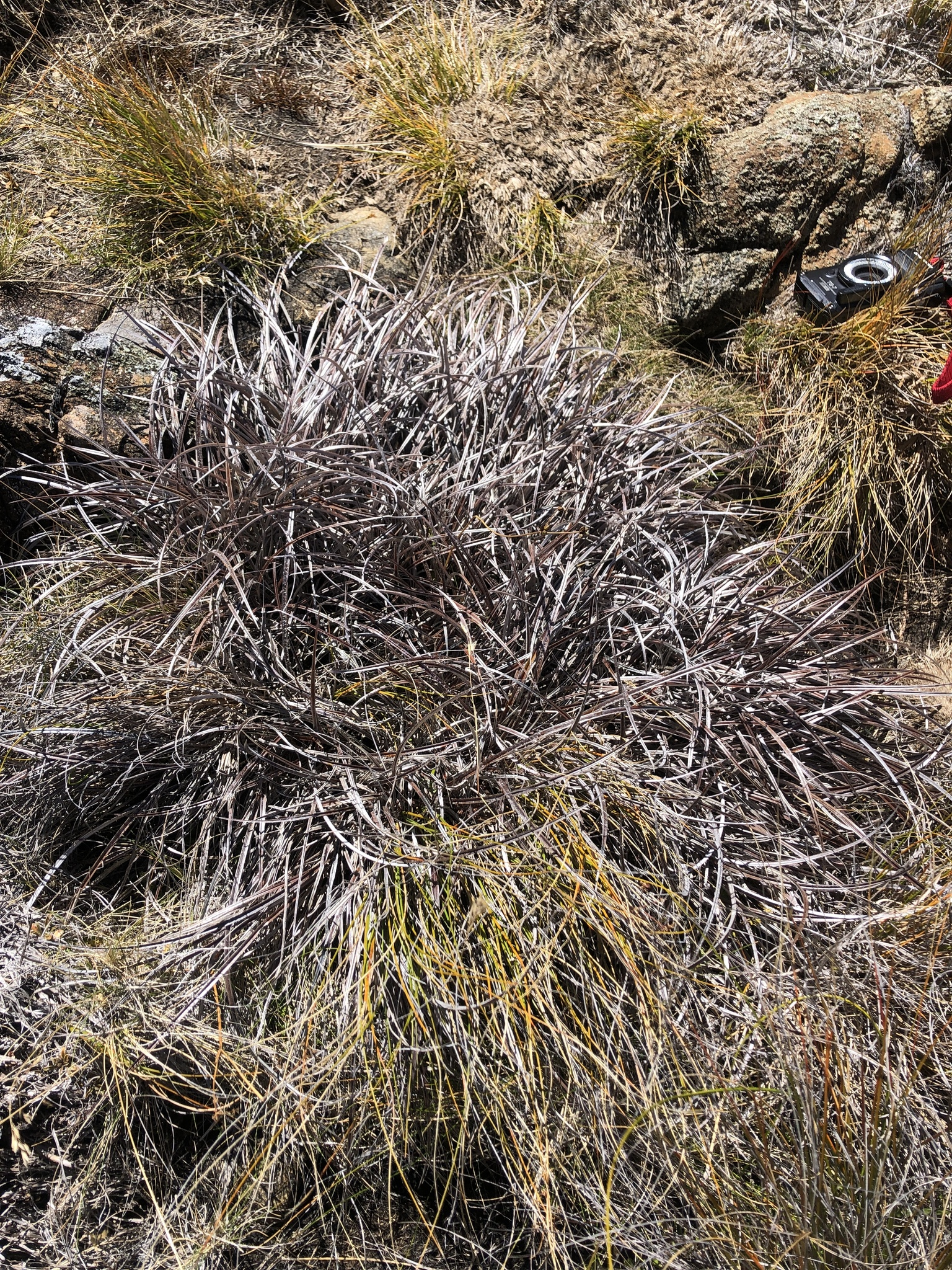
- Astelia graminea in Nelson Lakes National Park

Conservation status
- Not Threatened (NZ TCS)

Scientific classification
- Kingdom: Plantae
- Clade: Tracheophytes
- Clade: Angiosperms
- Clade: Monocots
- Order: Asparagales
- Family: Asteliaceae
- Genus: Astelia
- Species: A. graminea

Binomial name
- Astelia graminea L.B.Moore

= Astelia graminea =

Species of flowering plant

Astelia graminea is a species of plant, endemic to New Zealand.

== Description ==
Astelia graminea looks rather like a grass without tufts, which makes it readily identifiable in the field. Although astelia means 'stemless', there is a stem to this plant, which is around 1cm in diameter. From this stem long, grass-like leaves with a deep keel spread out evenly. The leaves are brown on one side, and then buff and felted on the other side.

The flowers are green, red, or pink. They bloom in January, and the orange fruit is present from March to April. The plant is perennial.

The key used to distinguish this species in the original description is as follows:

Leaf lamina narrow, mostly ± 1 cm wide, dull brown adaxially, nerves on each side of midrib usually <6; habit diffuse and grasslike owing to lateral shoots developing in axils of many leaves; panicle simple, each spathe subtending only 1 raceme; fruit nearly twice as long as broad.

== Range and habitat ==
Astelia graminea is known from the northern part of the South Island. It is known only from Nelson and west Marlborough, from the Wairau Mountains to Gouland Downs. This species is currently not considered threatened.

== Ecology ==
The seeds in the berries are scattered through frugivory. Honey bees and flies are known to visit the flowers.

It collocates with Chionocloa australis in open grasslands at altitude. It collocates with Astelia nivicola near Lake Adelaide, and near Mt. Arthur.

== Etymology ==
Graminea means 'grassy' in Latin. Astelia means 'stemless'.

== Taxonomy ==
It may hybridize with Astelia banksii and Astelia solandri in the wild.

The type locality is from the Travers Range in Nelson.
