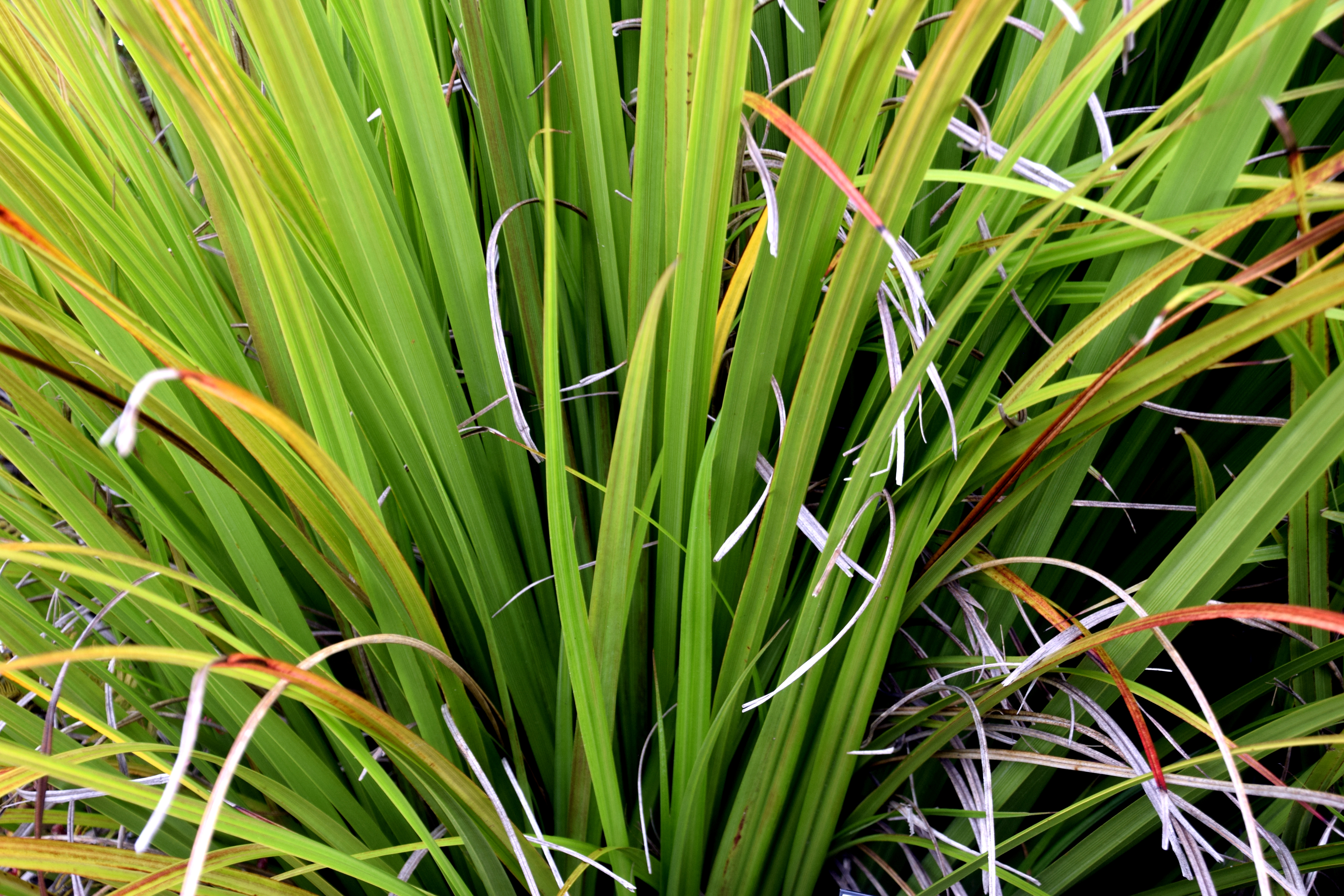

Scientific classification
- Kingdom: Plantae
- Clade: Tracheophytes
- Clade: Angiosperms
- Clade: Monocots
- Order: Asparagales
- Family: Asteliaceae
- Genus: Astelia
- Species: A. trinervia

Binomial name
- Astelia trinervia Kirk

= Astelia trinervia =

Species of flowering plant of the family Asteliaceae

Astelia trinervia is a species of rhizomatous tufted perennial native to New Zealand. It has a common name of 'kauri grass', and a Māori language name of kōkaha.

Astelia trinervia is endemic the North Island from Awakino in Waikato and across to the coast of Tauranga. It is also found in north of the South Island near Nelson.

== Description ==
Astelia trinervia 620079593

Astelia trinervia Kirk nmnhbotany 15698806 NMNH-03946869

Astelia trinerva has glossy orange-red berries and glossy black seeds. It usually grows 40 to 80 centimetres tall. It has clumps of arching foliage and looks a bit like harakeke. The leaves are olive-grey-green. Distinctive to this species there is a 'prominent central rib flanked by two parallel lateral nerves.'

The name 'astelia' is from Greek, "lacking a stem", a flowering plant, monocotyledon. Astelia are a tufted plant that look like grasses or flax. They are mostly a Pacific genus, with many, 15, in New Zealand, including the more common astelia banksii.

The preferred habitat for astelia trinerva is places with 'high ambient humidity and consistent oceanic influences'.

An example occurrence of this species is in the North Island's Hamilton Ecological District, where it occurs in the understory associated with Blechnum discolor (crown fern) and overstory forest elements of rimu and Nothofagus trees.

It is a dioecious plant, it has female and male plants. The pale or white flowers are panicles. It flowers in late spring and berries are present through winter.

It thrives in the acidic soil of kauri forests.

It is used in landscaping including architectural foliage planting, and has adaptability to shaded gardens.

== Cultural significance ==
The cultural significance to Māori of the plant astelia trinervia includes customary use of the berries and seeds that were eaten and also used as a dye. Other customary uses included hat making, thatching and candle wicks.
