= Proditrix tetragona =

Scientific classification
- Kingdom: Animalia
- Phylum: Arthropoda
- Clade: Pancrustacea
- Class: Insecta
- Order: Lepidoptera
- Family: Plutellidae
- Genus: Proditrix
- Species: P. tetragona

Binomial name
- Proditrix tetragona (Hudson, 1918)

Synonyms
- Titanomis tetragona Hudson, 1918

Species of moth endemic to New Zealand

Proditrix tetragona is a species of moth in the family Glyphipterigidae. It was first described by George Hudson in 1918. It is endemic to New Zealand and has been observed only in the North Island. It inhabits subalpine forests. Adults are on the wing in January and October and are attracted to light. The larvae of this species feed on Astelia hastata and Freycinetia banksii.

== Taxonomy ==
This species was first described by George Hudson in 1918 and originally named Titanomis tetragona. In 1928 Hudson discussed and illustrated this species in his book The butterflies and moths of New Zealand. In 1987 John S. Dugdale placed this species in the genus Proditrix. Dugdale, in 1988, confirmed this placement. The holotype specimen, collected by Morris Watt on Mount Taranaki in January at 3,000 feet (910 m), is held at Te Papa. Although the holotype specimen is recorded as a male in the original description of the species, Dugdale states the specimen is female.

== Description ==
Illustration by Hudson.

Holotype of P. tetragona.

The larva of this species is 42 millimetres (1.7 in) and has a rough nodular textured skin. It is coloured a dark grey on the upper surface and sides with a pale under surface.

Hudson described this species as follows:

The expansion of the wings of the male is fully 2 1/4 inches. The fore wings are oblong with the costa strongly arched ; deep purplish-brown obscurely mottled with darker and with faint bronzy reflections; there is a large irregular patch of paler scales in the disc near the base; a large dull whitish triangular patch on the tornus, its apex almost reaching the costa; this patch is thickly streaked with grey; the terminal area is clouded with warm purplish-brown ; there is a very conspicuous, almost square, pinkish-ochreous blotch on the costa immediately before the apex. The hind wings are pale ochreous very heavily dappled with grey. All the cilia are ochreous with pale greyish-brown basal line and tips. The head is ochreous, the thorax pale purplish-brown and the abdomen dark.

This species is close to P. megalynta as indicated by the similarities in the two species' male genitalia and also the appearance of their larvae.

== Distribution ==
P. tetragona is endemic to New Zealand and has been observed in the North Island only.

== Habitat and hosts ==
This species frequents subalpine forests. The larvae feed on Collospermum hastatum (now known as Astelia hastata) and Freycinetia banksii. Larvae have been observed living the moist environment of the center of these plants, feeding on the tips of new shoots growing from them.

== Behaviour ==
Adults are on the wing in October and January are attracted to light.
