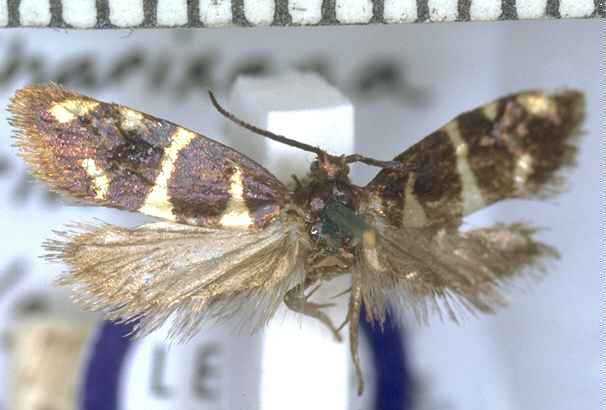
- Female lectotype

Scientific classification
- Kingdom: Animalia
- Phylum: Arthropoda
- Class: Insecta
- Order: Lepidoptera
- Family: Plutellidae
- Genus: Charixena; Meyrick, 1916
- Species: C. iridoxa

Binomial name
- Charixena iridoxa (Meyrick, 1916)

Synonyms
- Philpottia iridoxa Meyrick, 1916

= Charixena iridoxa =

Species of moth

Charixena iridoxa, also known as the Astelia zig-zag moth, is a moth classified sometimes in the family Glyphipterigidae and sometimes in Plutellidae. It was first described by Edward Meyrick in 1916. This species is endemic to New Zealand and has been observed in the North, South and Stewart Islands. The life cycle of this moth is at least two years in length with the larvae inhabiting the bulb of its host plants and mining the underside of its leaves. These mines have a distinctive zig-zag appearance and can be easily recognised when looked for on the host plants. The larvae pupate in a cocoon attached to the leaf and this stage takes place between February and August. The adult moths emerge in the early spring and are fast, day flying moths. Their larval hosts are plants in the genus Astelia and include Astelia fragrans and Astelia nervosa.

== Taxonomy ==
This species was first described by Edward Meyrick using specimens collected at Mount Burns in the Hunter Mountains and originally named Philpottia iridoxa. In 1921 Meyrick, recognising that the genus name Philpottia was preoccupied, placed this species in the genus Charixena. In 1924 Morris N. Watt published a paper giving details of the life cycle and describing the larva and pupa of this moth. George Hudson discussed and illustrated this species in his 1928 book The butterflies and moths of New Zealand. The female lectotype is held at the Natural History Museum, London.

== Description ==
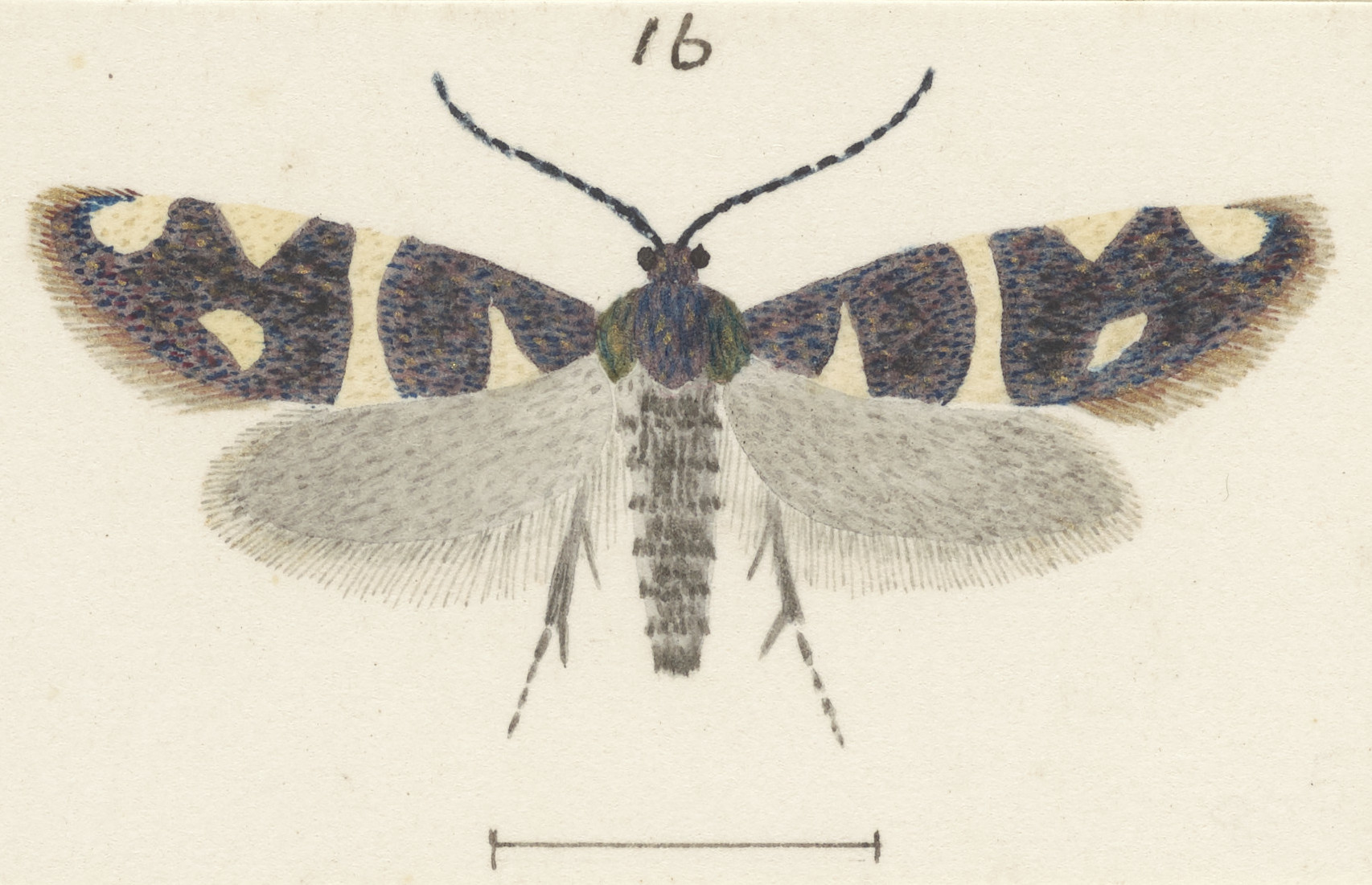
Illustration of male by Hudson.

Watt described the larva of this species as follows:

A full-grown larva is 21 mm. or more in length, cylindrical, spindle shaped, its greatest diameter about 3 mm. at the third abdominal segment, thence much attenuated towards either end. To the naked eye it is apparently without legs, these being very small, and it is very sluggish in its movements when exposed. The segments are shallowly incised, excepting the seventh and eighth abdominals. Spiracles small, brown, circular. Head small, flattened, light brown. General body-colour transparent shiny white. Tubercles and setae minute and very inconspicuous.

Watt also described the pupa and cocoon of this species as follows:

The exposed cocoon ... is shallow, elliptical, its ends somewhat pointed and depressed into the leaf; its long axis is parallel to that of the leaf; average size about 15 mm. by 3 mm. ... The pupa lies in the cocoon in an upright position, its ventral surface innermost. Colour at first pale creamy white, becoming later light brown, darker on dorsum, to black with pale markings on wings prior to emergence. It is somewhat compressed dorso-ventrally, the ventral surface being more or less keeled or prominent along the mid-line, so that a transverse section about the fourth abdominal segment would be broadly triangular in shape.

Meyrick described the adults of this species as follows:

♂♀. 14-15 mm. Head and thorax purple-coppery-metallic. Antennae deep purple. Abdomen dark fuscous. Forewings elongate, posteriorly slightly dilated, more so in ♂, costa gently arched, apex obtuse, termen obliquely rounded; coppery-purple, with strong peacock-blue gloss; markings ochreous-whitish; slender transverse fasciae at 1/4 and middle, triangularly dilated on dorsum, more strongly in ♂, first not reaching costa; a triangular or wedge-shaped spot on costa at 2/3, one more elongate on costa towards apex, and a narrow posteriorly oblique mark from just before tornus : cilia bronzy-grey, basal third coppery-blue-purple. Hindwings in ♂ dark grey, in ♀ grey : cilia grey.

== Distribution ==
This species is endemic to New Zealand. It is found from the middle of the North Island southwards including in the South Island as well as Stewart Island. This species has been collected in the Hunter Mountains, the Ruahine Mountains and on Mount Taranaki, at Mount Arthur and Arthur's Pass, in Otago, at Lake Te Anau and in Milford Sound. Mount Te Aroha forms the northernmost known location for this species. Although this moth is widespread as evidenced by the prevalence of its larvae feeding on Astelia species, observing the adult moth is rare.

== Habitat and hosts ==
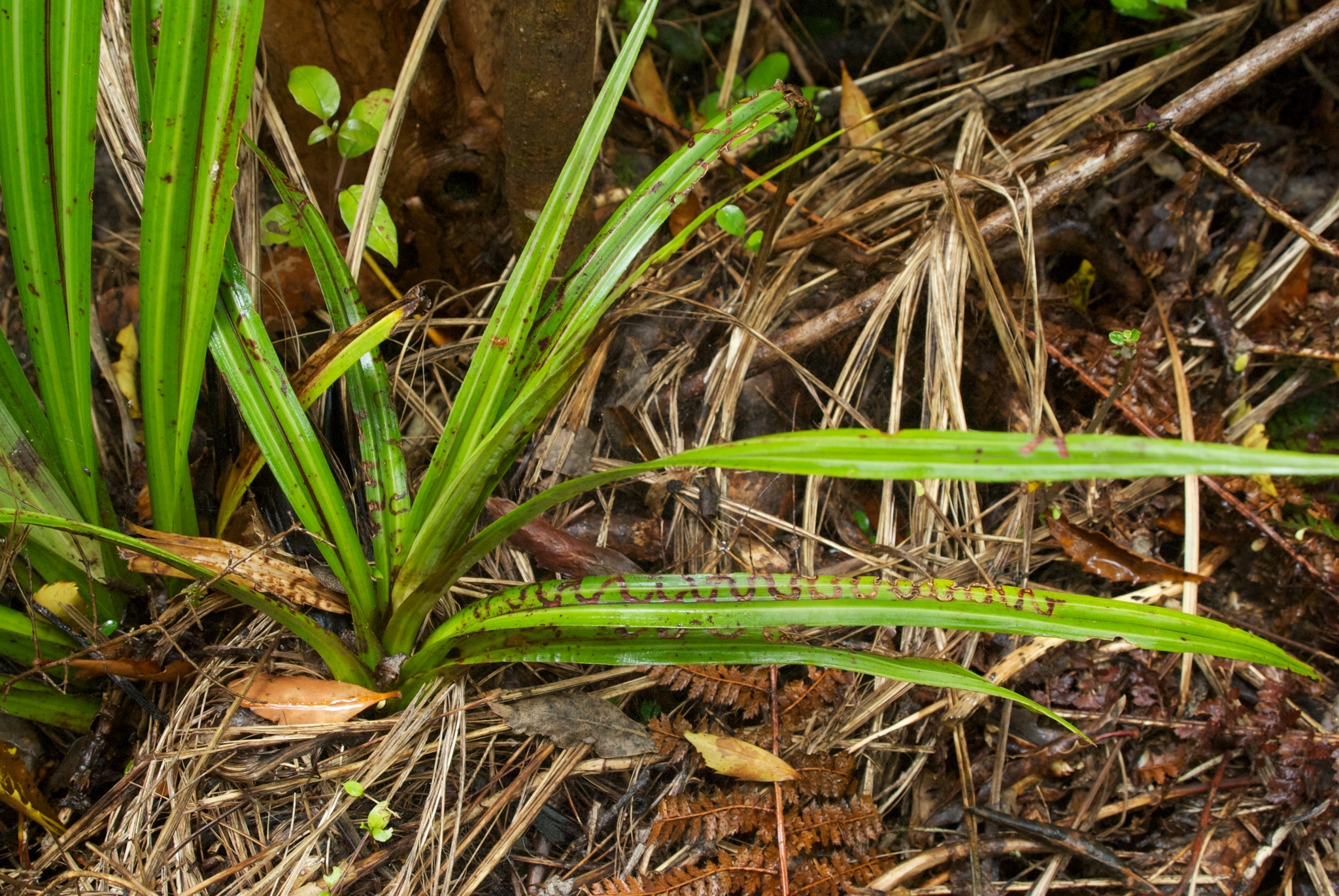
Leaf mine on Astelia fragrans by the larvae of Charixena iridoxa.

This species inhabits forests and in mountainous terrain, just above the tree-line, where its host plants are prevalent. The larval hosts of C. iridoxa are species in the plant genus Astelia including Astelia fragrans and Astelia nervosa.

== Life cycle ==
The larva of C. iridoxa live below ground in the bulb of its host plant and takes at least two years to mature. It mines the underside of leaves of its host plant from within the bulb of the plant and the leaf mine becomes visible as the leaf grows. The leaf mines have a zig-zag shape and are distinctive in appearance. The larva will travel upwards on to the plant leaf to pupate within a cocoon formed inside a leaf. As this cocoon is attached to the leaf it will move away from the bulb of the plant as the leaf grows. This pupation stage takes place from February until August. The adult emerges in early spring. This emergence date may go some way to explain the comparatively few times the adult of this species has been observed compared to its widespread and numerous nature.

== Behaviour ==
The adults of this species are on the wing from October to December and are fast day flying moths.
