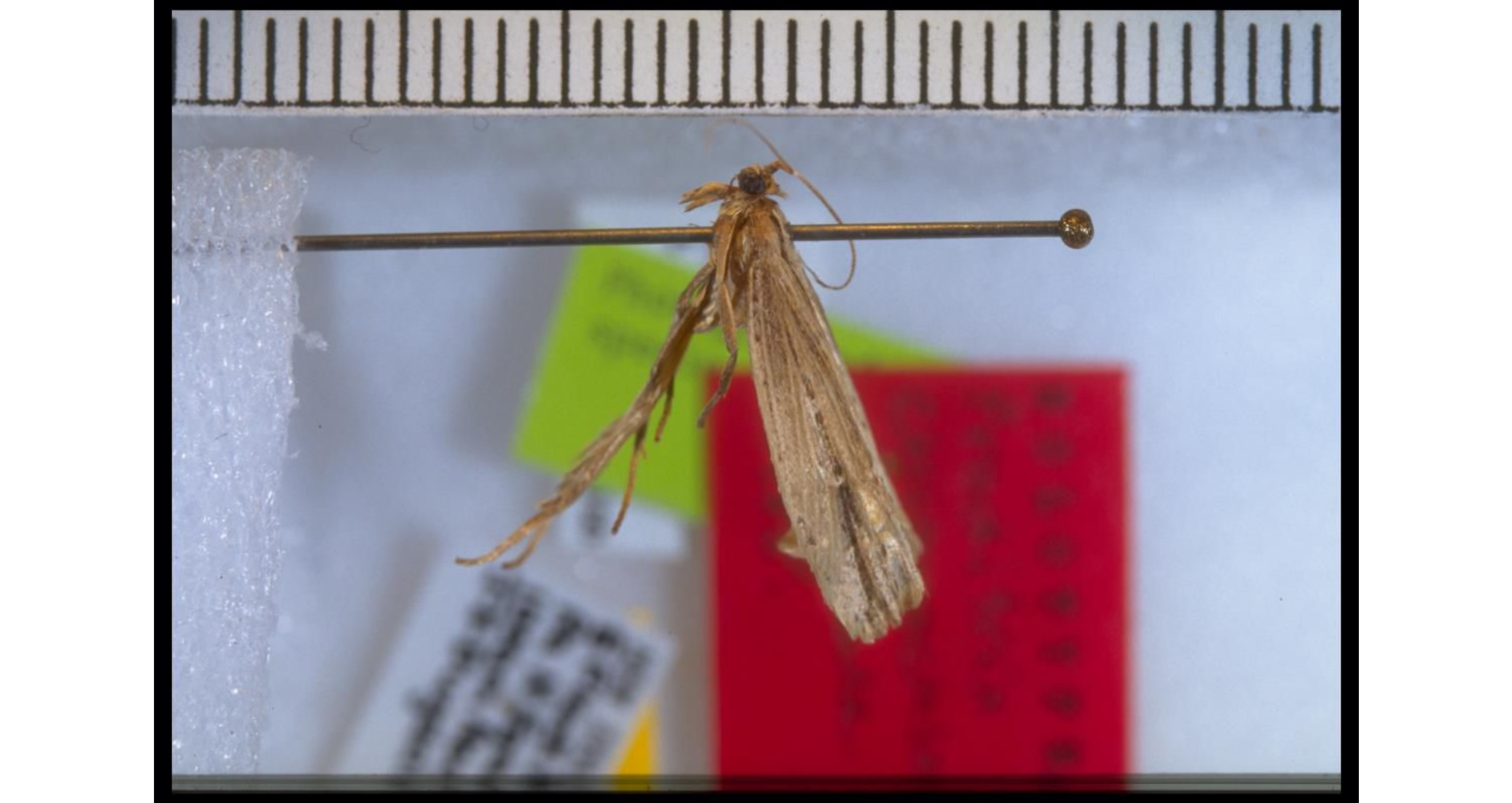
- Holotype

Conservation status
- Data Deficit (NZ TCS)

Scientific classification
- Kingdom: Animalia
- Phylum: Arthropoda
- Clade: Pancrustacea
- Class: Insecta
- Order: Lepidoptera
- Family: Plutellidae
- Genus: Proditrix
- Species: P. chionochloae

Binomial name
- Proditrix chionochloae Dugdale, 1987

= Proditrix chionochloae =

Species of moth endemic to New Zealand

Proditrix chionochloae is a species of moth in the family Glyphipterigidae. It is endemic to New Zealand. In 2025 this species was classified as "data deficient" under the New Zealand Threat Classification System.

== Taxonomy ==
P. chionochloae was described by John S. Dugdale in 1987 using specimens collected by him at the Pouakai Range in Taranaki. The holotype specimen is held in the New Zealand Arthropod Collection.

== Description ==
Both the male and female adults have wings and their wingspan is 25mm. This moth is similar in appearance to Proditrix megalynta with its buff coloured body and legs but P. chionochloae have a greater number of dark spots on the top of their wings. P. chionochloae can also be distinguished as its genital characteristics are different from P. megalynta and they have a longer third segment of the labial palpi.

== Distribution ==
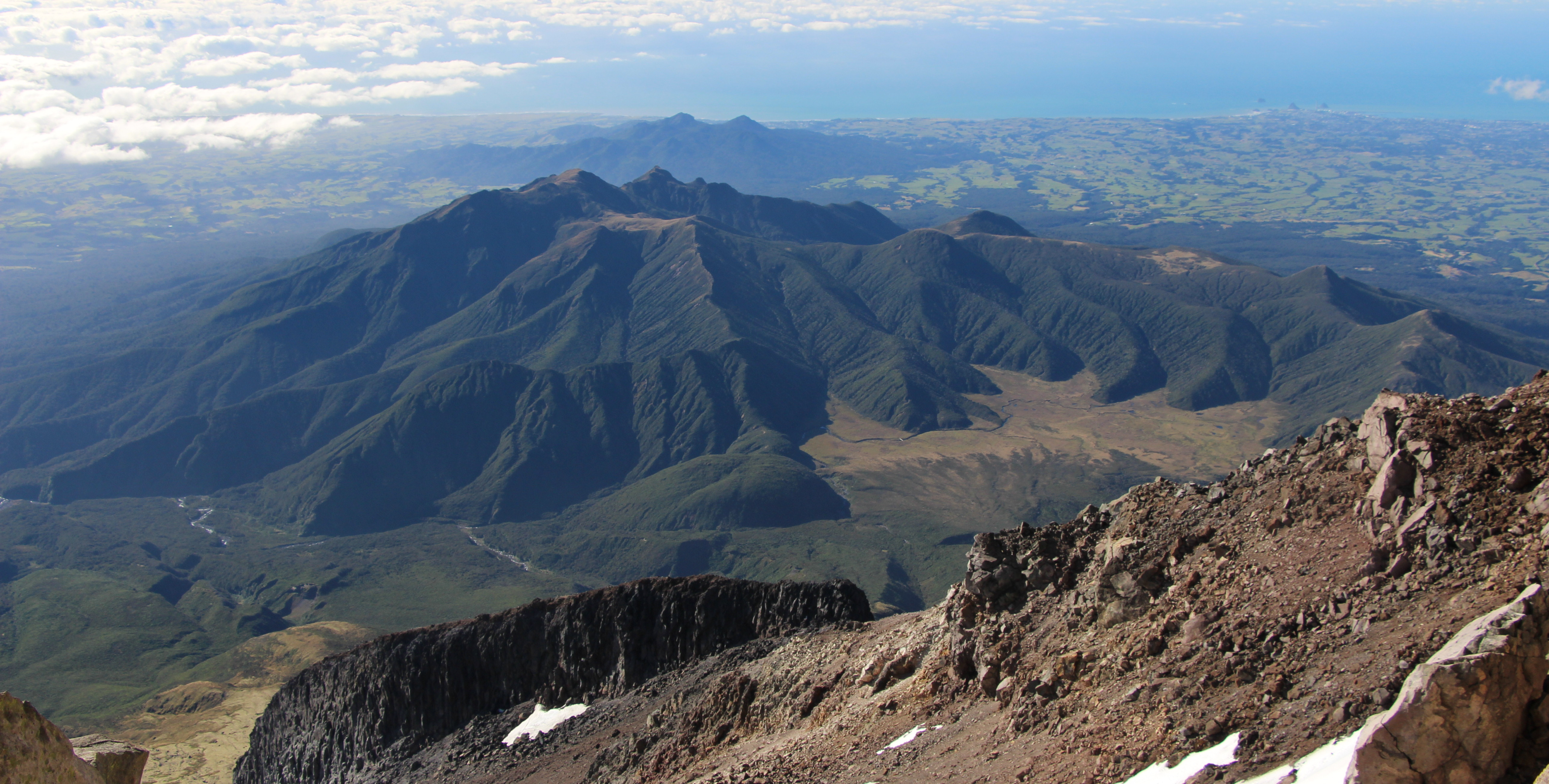
Pouakai Range

This species is endemic to New Zealand. It can only be found in Taupō and Taranaki at the Pouakai Range.

== Host plant ==
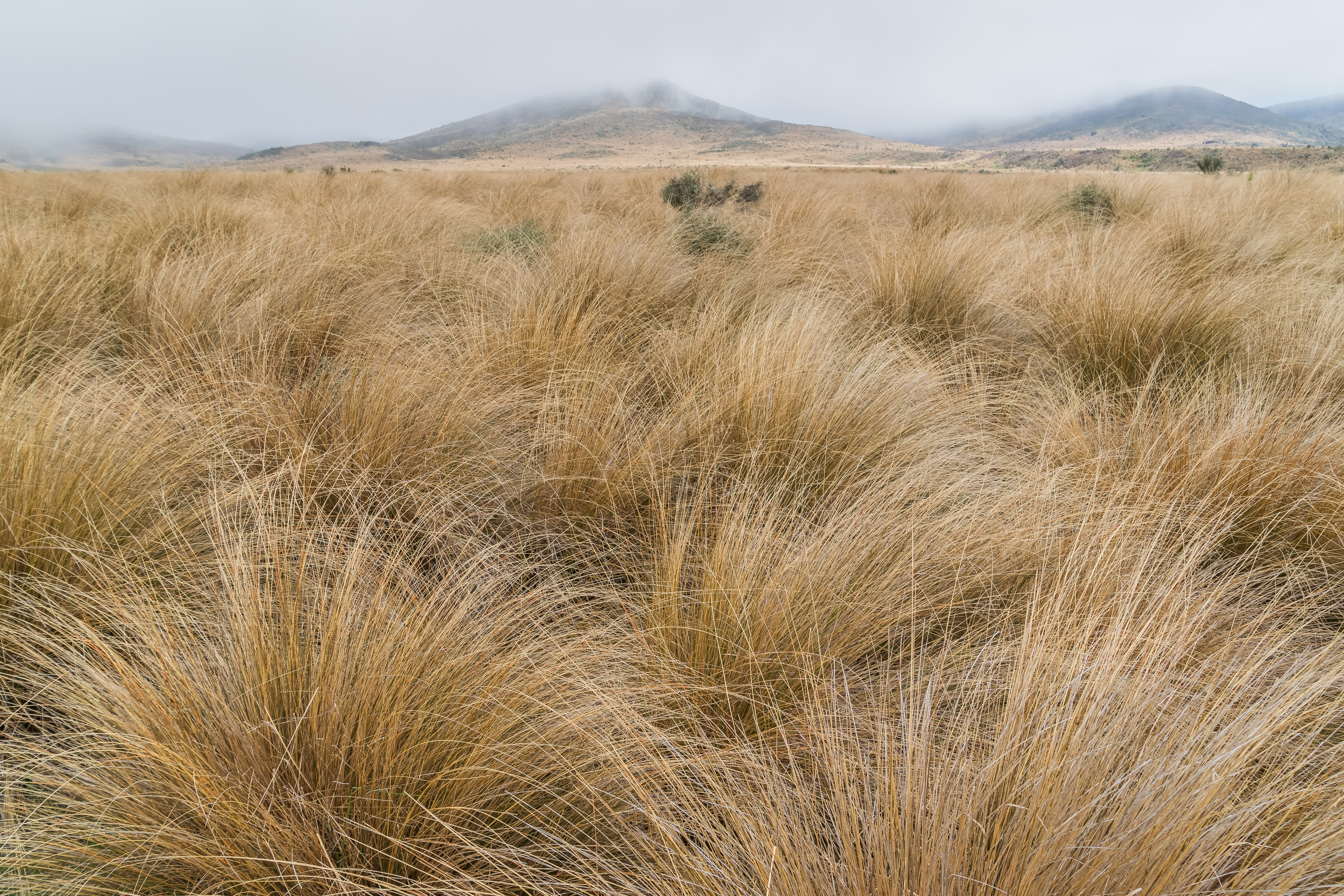
Chionochloa rubra

The host plant of this species is Chionochloa rubra. C. rubra is being invaded by heather in Taupō localities reducing the availability of this plant for larvae to feed on.

== Conservation status ==
In 2025 this species was classified by the New Zealand Department of Conservation as "data deficient" under the New Zealand Threat Classification System. P. chionochloae is regarded as being range restricted.
