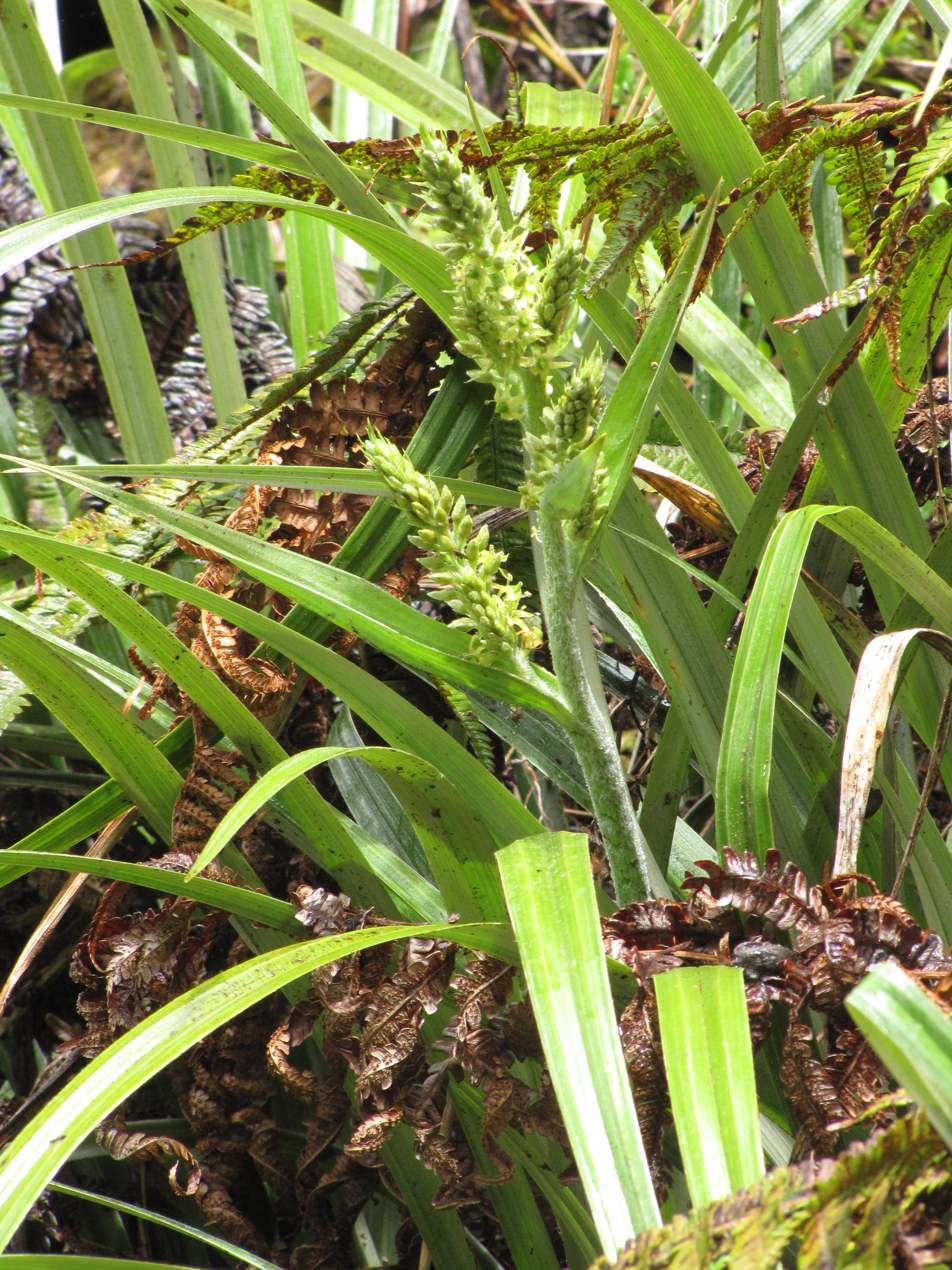

Conservation status
- Vulnerable (NatureServe)

Scientific classification
- Kingdom: Plantae
- Clade: Tracheophytes
- Clade: Angiosperms
- Clade: Monocots
- Order: Asparagales
- Family: Asteliaceae
- Genus: Astelia
- Species: A. menziesiana

Binomial name
- Astelia menziesiana Sm.

= Astelia menziesiana =

Species of plant

Astelia menziesiana is a species of plant in the family Asteliaceae that is endemic to the state of Hawaii in the United States. Hawaiian names for the plant are kaluaha, paʻiniu, or puaʻakuhinia. It is a non-woody, clumping plant that grows from 1 to 3 feet (0.30 to 0.91 m) in width/height. The plant can grow on tree branches and trunks as an epiphyte or in the ground. Leaves are silvery-green or green on top; undersides may be white, gold or silver. Flowers bloom in long spikes in colors including yellow, purple and red. Male and female flowers are on separate plants. Female plants have small orange-yellow berries which are eaten by birds. Two other species: Astelia argyrocoma and the rare and endangered A. waialealae are restricted to the island of Kauaʻi.
