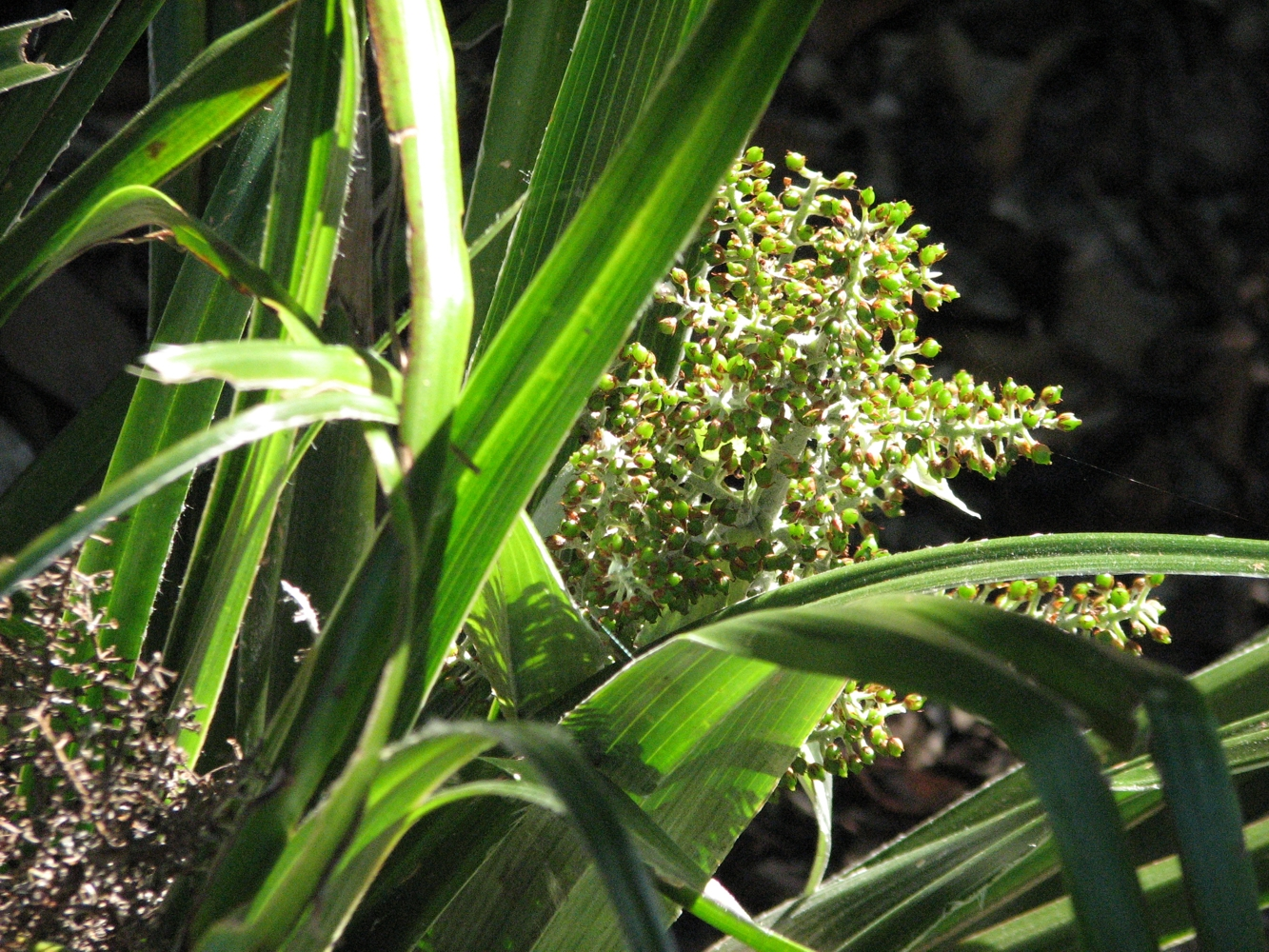

Scientific classification
- Kingdom: Plantae
- Clade: Tracheophytes
- Clade: Angiosperms
- Clade: Monocots
- Order: Asparagales
- Family: Asteliaceae
- Genus: Astelia
- Species: A. neocaledonica

Binomial name
- Astelia neocaledonica Schltr.

= Astelia neocaledonica =

Species of flowering plant

Astelia neocaledonica is a rhizomatous tufted perennial that is endemic to New Caledonia. The species produces clusters of mauve berries between October and November in the species native range.
