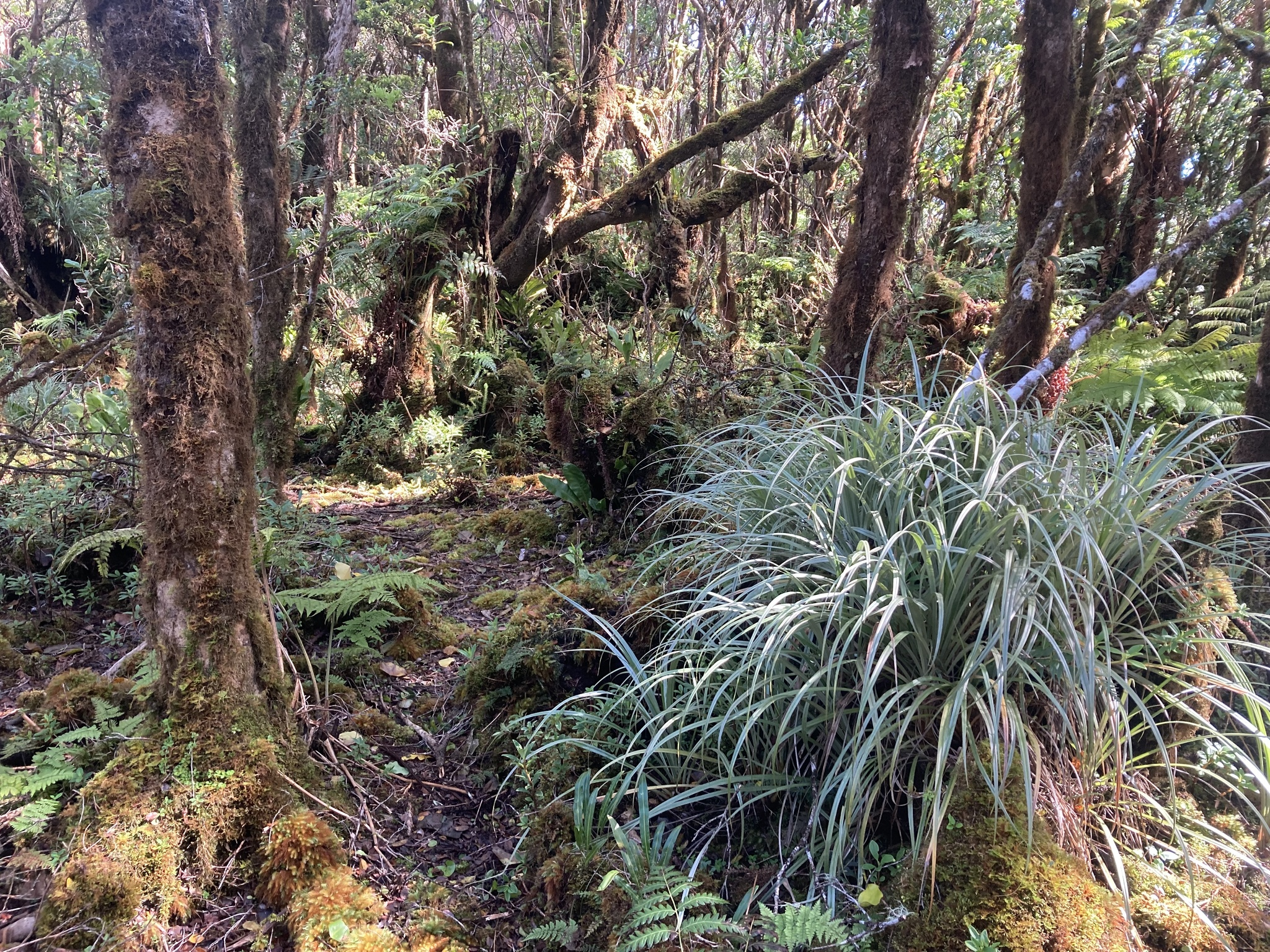
- Growing in montane cloud forest near the Alakaʻi plateau, Hawaii

Conservation status
- Endangered (IUCN 3.1)

- Imperiled (NatureServe)

Scientific classification
- Kingdom: Plantae
- Clade: Tracheophytes
- Clade: Angiosperms
- Clade: Monocots
- Order: Asparagales
- Family: Asteliaceae
- Genus: Astelia
- Species: A. argyrocoma

Binomial name
- Astelia argyrocoma A.Heller ex Skottsb.
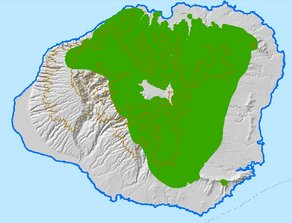
- Native range

= Astelia argyrocoma =

Species of flowering plant

Astelia argyrocoma is a species of Astelia endemic to the highlands of Kauaʻi in Hawaii, United States. This plant is found only in native Hawaiian tropical rainforests at higher elevations in forests dominated by ʻōhiʻa lehua trees.

== Description ==
Astelia arygyrocoma is a grass-like shrub with silvery-green leaves 40–100 cm (16–39 in) long and 0.4–1.1 cm (0.16–0.43 in) wide. The undersides of the leaves are silver. Flowers are green and reddish-brown, developing into bright orange berries.

== Distribution and habitat ==
Astelia argyrocoma can only be found in high elevation tropical montane cloud forests on Kauaʻi, between around 500 and 1,400 m (1,640 and 4,590 ft) elevation, particularly on the Alakaʻi plateau. It is absent from the very highest elevations of the island.
