= Charixena =

Charixena may refer to:

- Charixene, an Ancient Greek musician and poet
- Charixena iridoxa, a species of moth
