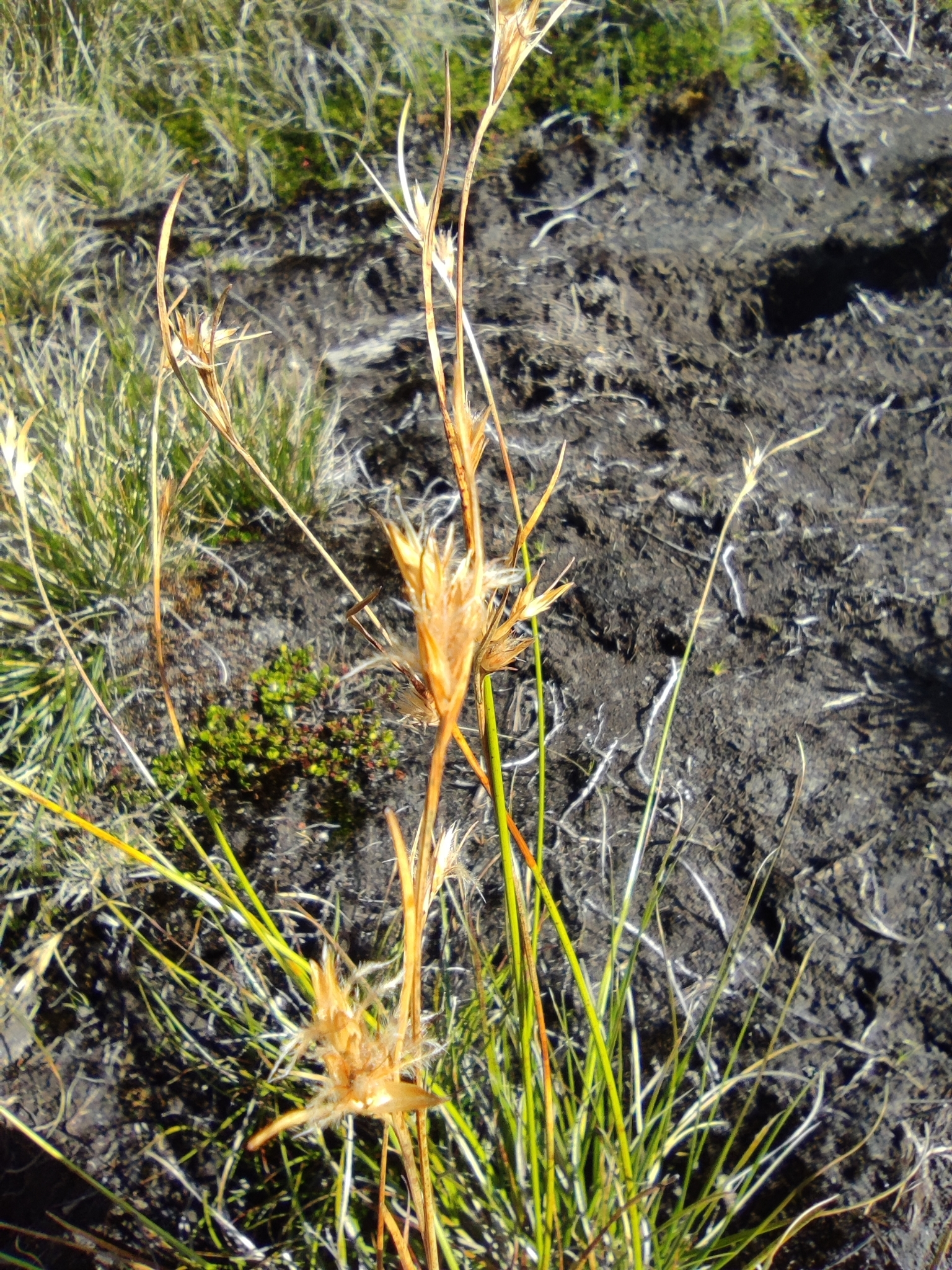
- Carpha schoenoides in Dalcahue, Southern Chile

Scientific classification
- Kingdom: Plantae
- Clade: Tracheophytes
- Clade: Angiosperms
- Clade: Monocots
- Clade: Commelinids
- Order: Poales
- Family: Cyperaceae
- Genus: Carpha; Banks & Sol. ex R.Br.

= Carpha =

Genus of flowering plants

Carpha is a genus of flowering plants belonging to the family Cyperaceae.

Its native range is Uganda to Southern Africa, Western Indian Ocean, Southern Japan, New Guinea to New Zealand, Southern South America.

Species:

- Carpha alpina R.Br.
- Carpha angustissima Cherm.
- Carpha aristata Kük.
- Carpha borbonica (Steud.) C.B.Clarke
- Carpha capitellata (Nees) Boeckeler
- Carpha curvata W.M.Curtis
- Carpha eminii (K.Schum.) C.B.Clarke
- Carpha filifolia C.Reid & T.H.Arnold
- Carpha glomerata Nees
- Carpha nitens (Kunth) Kük.
- Carpha nivicola F.Muell.
- Carpha perrieri Cherm.
- Carpha rodwayi W.M.Curtis
- Carpha schlechteri C.B.Clarke
- Carpha schoenoides Banks & Sol. ex Hook.f.
