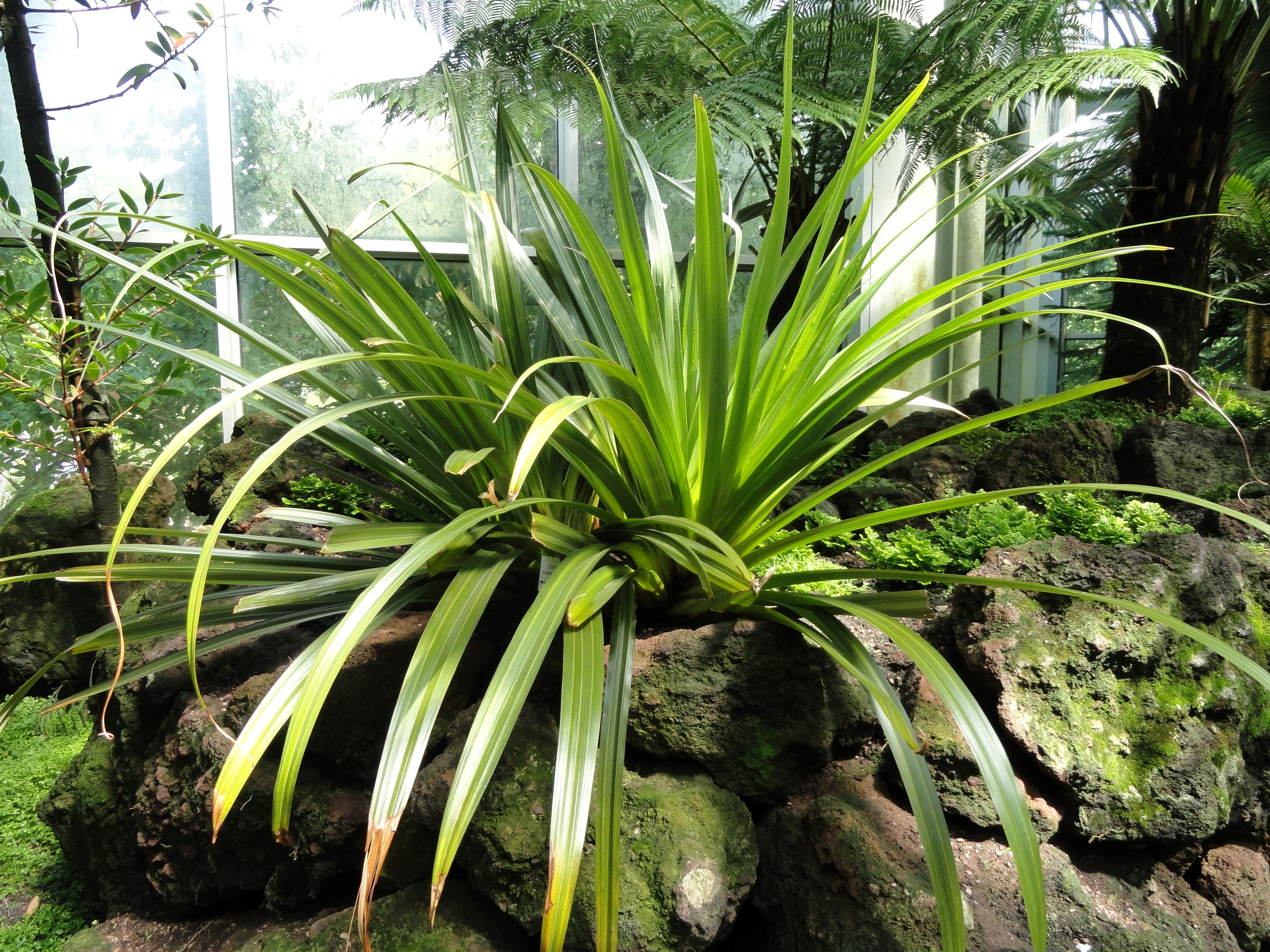

Scientific classification
- Kingdom: Plantae
- Clade: Tracheophytes
- Clade: Angiosperms
- Clade: Monocots
- Order: Asparagales
- Family: Asteliaceae
- Genus: Astelia
- Species: A. hastata

Binomial name
- Astelia hastata Colenso

Synonyms
- Collospermum hastatum (Colenso) Skottsb.

= Astelia hastata =

Species of plant

Astelia hastata, commonly known as the kahakaha, widow maker, perching lily, and tank lily, is an epiphyte species endemic to New Zealand.

== Description ==
Similar to other epiphytic Astelia species, A. hastata is tufted, growing leaves in a fan-like arrangement with roots growing through the base of the leaves. The overlap of the leaves at the base forms a phytotelma where soil and water collect. This area is commonly used as a nesting ground by flies as well as amphibian and lizard species such as Leiopelma archeyi.

A. hastata is dioecious, with each plant forming either male or female flowers, in panicles and generally insect-pollinated, between January and March. These flowers then produce fruit which ripen from March to August. The ripe fruit are red, containing a large quantity of black seeds surrounded by a thick aril. A. hastata fruit are a food source for native species including kererū, pekapeka and South Island kōkako.

== Traditional uses ==
A. hastata was an important plant for indigenous Māori, who ate the fruit and used the leaves for weaving baskets, headbands and sandals. White fibers on the underside of certain leaves were also used as an ornament in women's hair.

== In culture ==
A. hastata was named "widow maker" by early European bushmen due to its tendency to fall from host trees unpredictably, for example during strong winds. The plant is capable of regrowing after falling from a host tree.

== Gallery ==
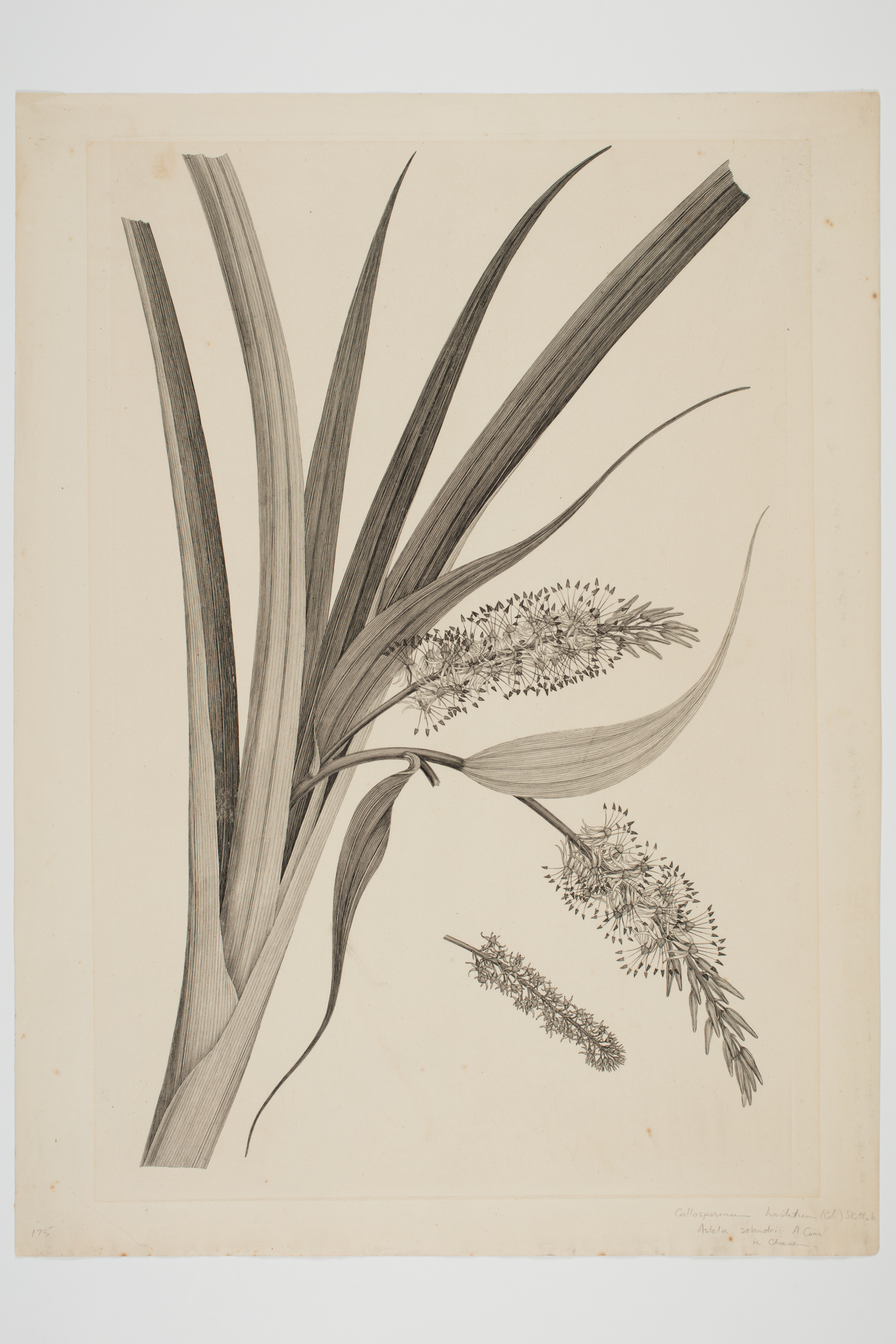
18th century illustration of A. hastata

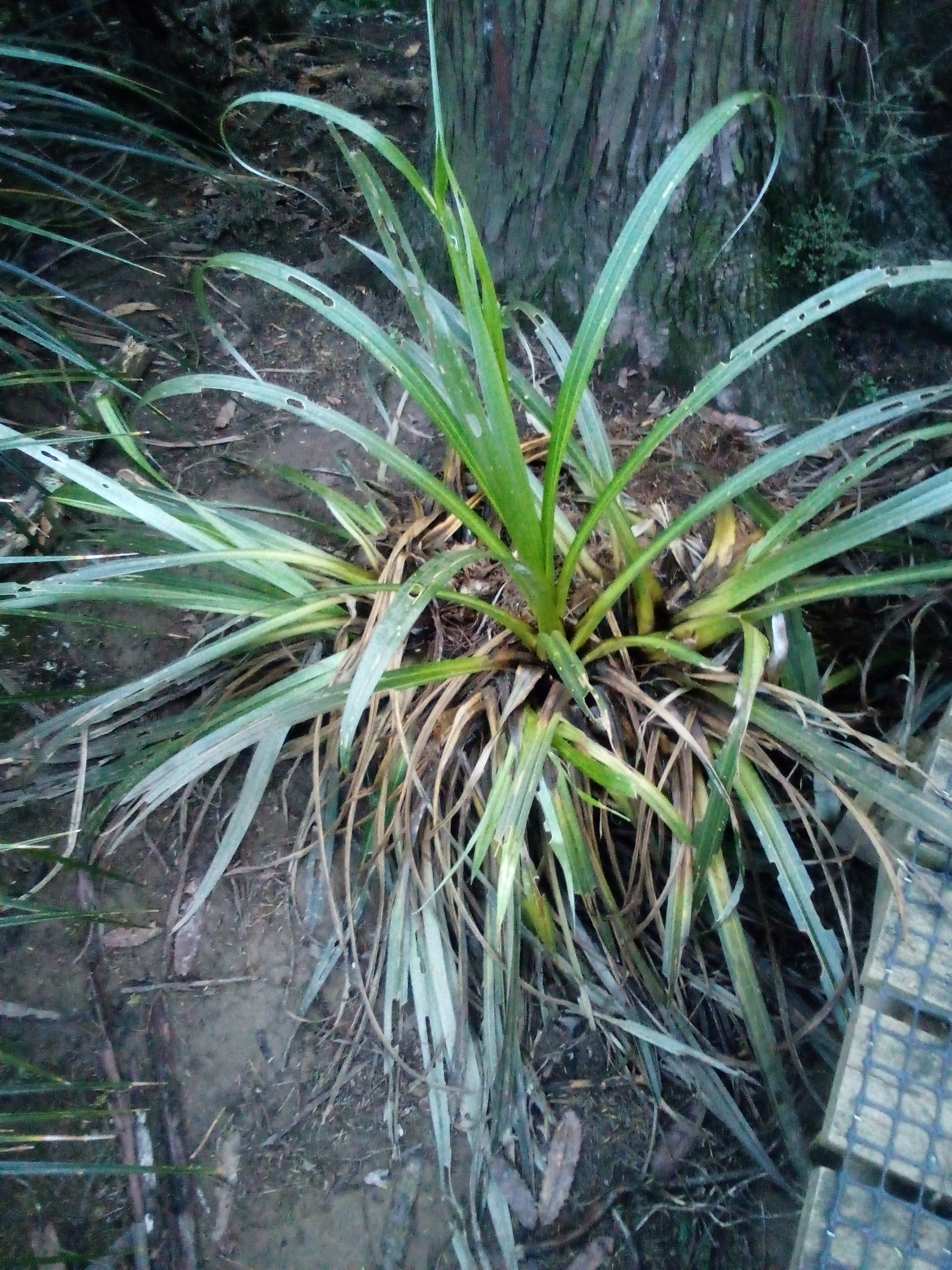
Regrowth after falling from canopy

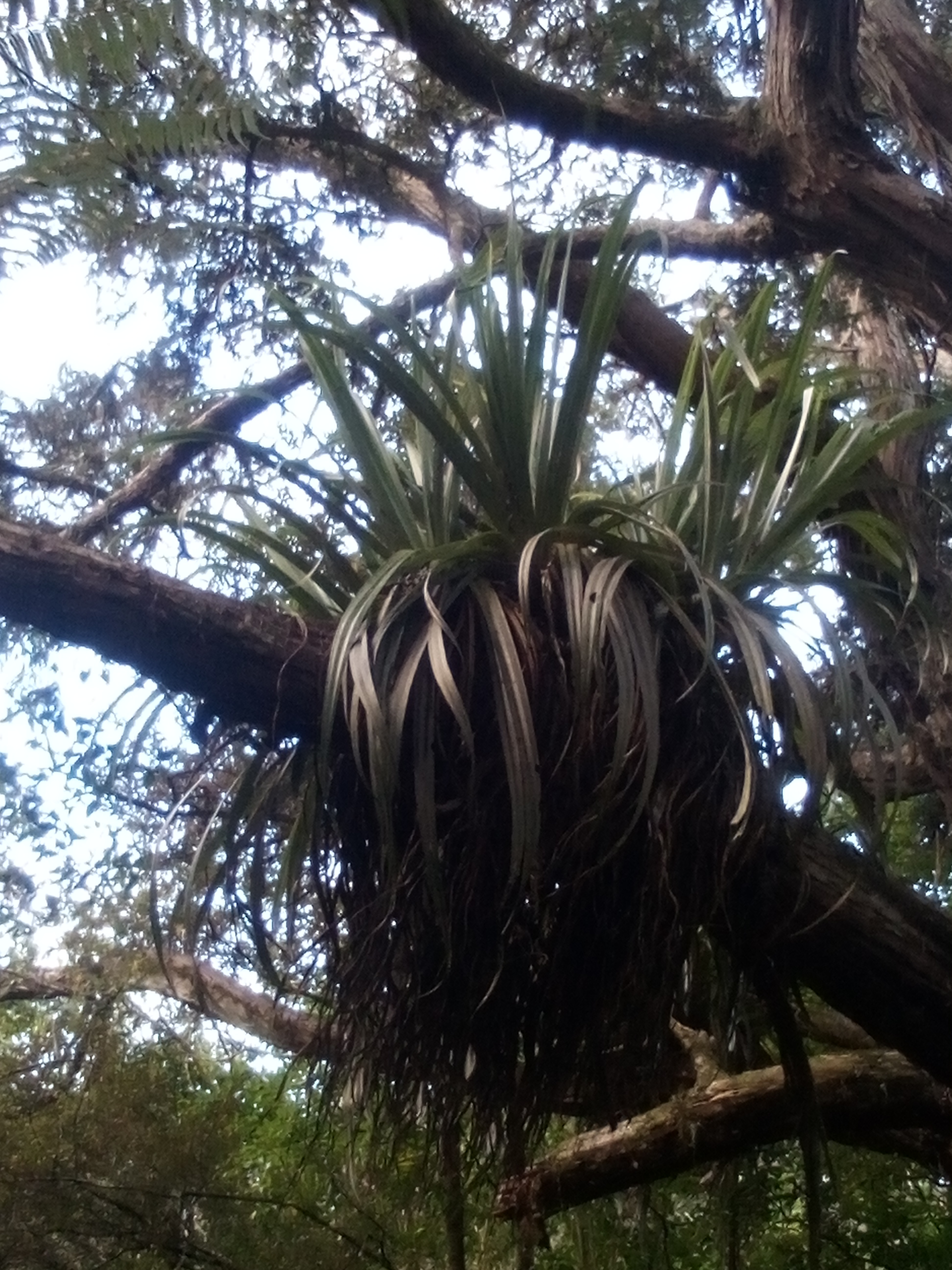
A. hastata growing on a tōtara tree

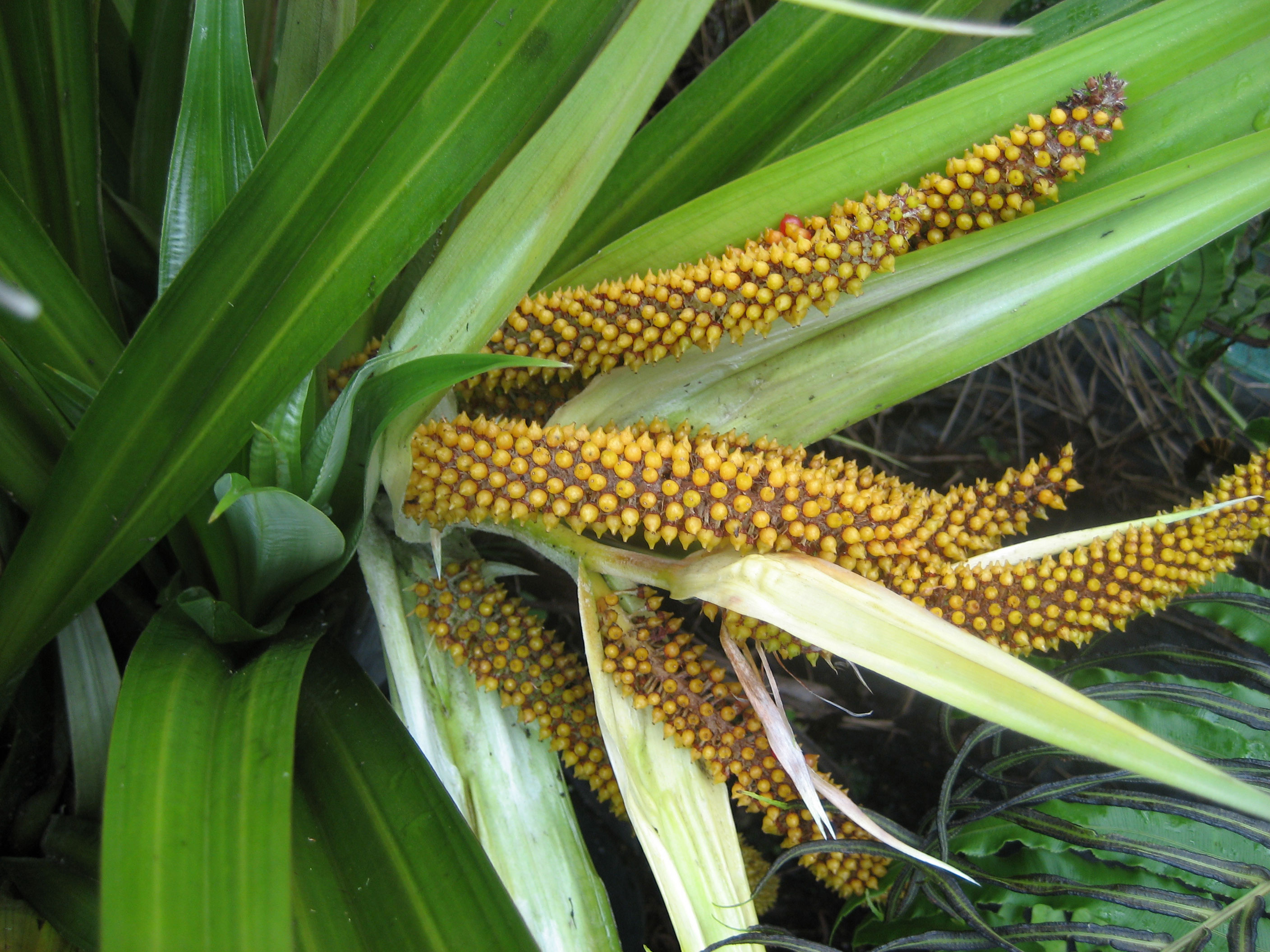
Close-up showing developing fruit
