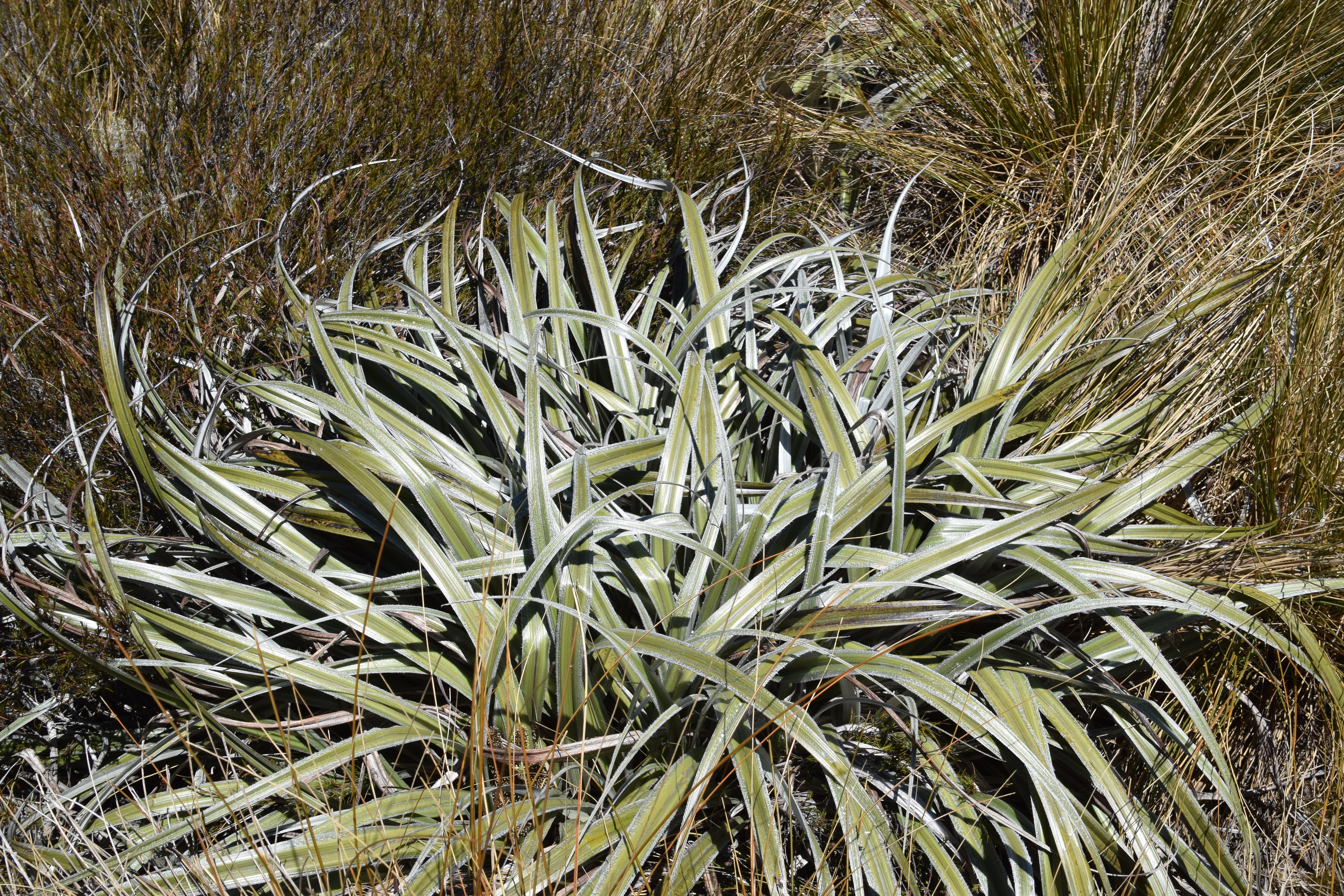

Scientific classification
- Kingdom: Plantae
- Clade: Tracheophytes
- Clade: Angiosperms
- Clade: Monocots
- Order: Asparagales
- Family: Asteliaceae
- Genus: Astelia
- Species: A. nivicola

Binomial name
- Astelia nivicola (Cockayne) ex Cheeseman, 1925

= Astelia nivicola =

Species of flowering plant

Astelia nivicola is a species of flowering plant in the family Asteliaceae. It is native to the New Zealand.

== Description ==
Cheeseman published this description posthumously in 1925:

A tufted herb forming extensive patches in moist alpine hollows. Leaves 6-12 in. long, 1/5-1/4 in. broad at the middle, coriaceous but flexible, gradually tapering upwards into an acute apex, keeled towards the base and stem-clasping, and then suddenly expanded into a thin and membranous almost transparent sheath; upper surface pale bronzy-green to glaucous-green, covered with a membranousnpellicle or more or less silky-tomentose; under-surface clothed with thin shaggy or villous whitish tomentum; veins variable in number, usually about 6 on each side of the rather slender midrib, which is sunken above but prominent beneath. Flowers not seen. Fruiting-panicle (one specimen alone seen) very short, 3/4 in. long and about as wide, nearly sessile among the bases of the uppermost leaves; branches few, short, densely compacted. Berry apparently ovoid-globose, 1/4-1/3 in. long, reddish-orange, sunk in the persistent base of the perianth.

== Distribution ==
Astelia nivicola is native to South Island of New Zealand.
