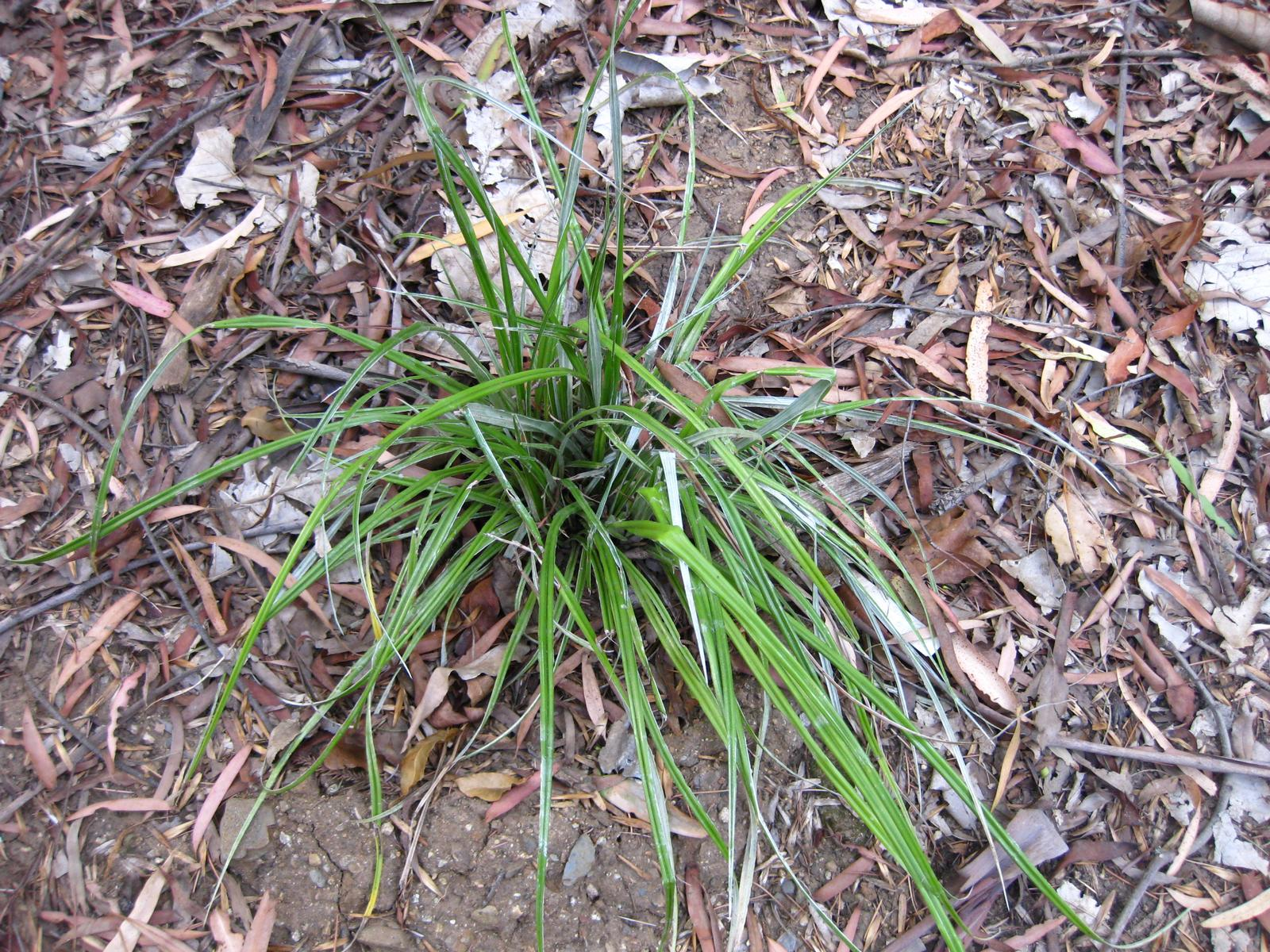

Scientific classification
- Kingdom: Plantae
- Clade: Tracheophytes
- Clade: Angiosperms
- Clade: Monocots
- Order: Asparagales
- Family: Asteliaceae
- Genus: Astelia
- Species: A. banksii

Binomial name
- Astelia banksii A.Cunn.

= Astelia banksii =

Species of flowering plant

Astelia banksii is an evergreen silver-green plant from the beaches of New Zealand. Its common names are coastal astelia, or, in Māori, kowharawhara, a name used for streams in Wellington and on Kapiti Island, though generally the southern limit of the plant is Kawhia and Tauranga. It has white to pale green flowers in spring, purple-black berries in autumn (spread by birds) and grows best in full sun to partial shade and in fertile and well-drained soil.

The name 'astelia' is from Greek, "lacking a stem", a flowering plant, monocotyledon.
