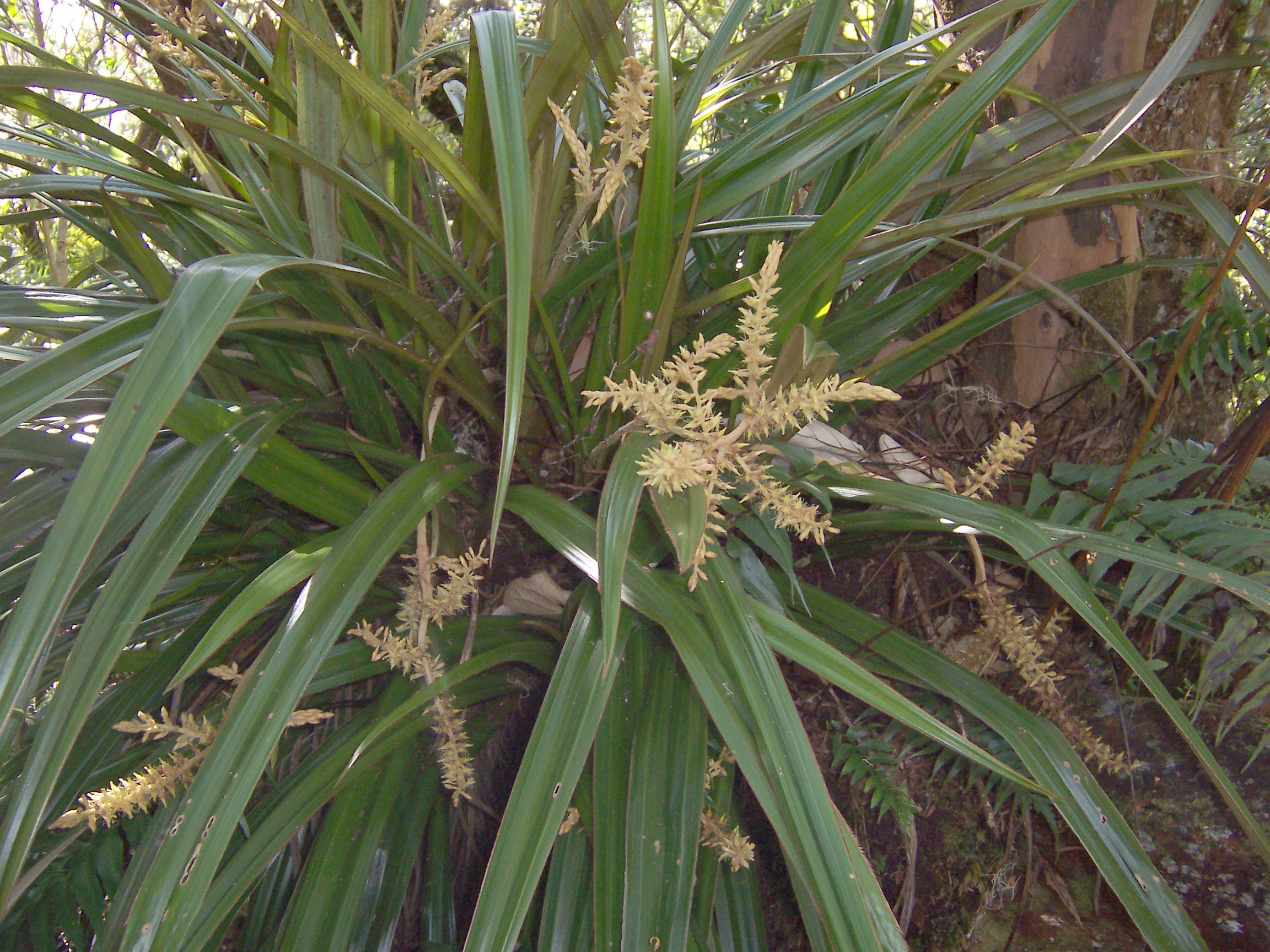
- Astelia hemichrysa in Réunion

Scientific classification
- Kingdom: Plantae
- Clade: Tracheophytes
- Clade: Angiosperms
- Clade: Monocots
- Order: Asparagales
- Family: Asteliaceae
- Genus: Astelia; Banks & Sol. ex R.Br.

Synonyms
- Collospermum Skottsb.; Funckia Willd.; Hamelinia A.Rich.

= Astelia =

Genus of plants

Astelia is a genus of flowering plants in the recently named family Asteliaceae. They are rhizomatous tufted perennials native to various islands in the Pacific, Indian, and South Atlantic Oceans, as well as to Australia and to the southernmost tip of South America. A significant number of the known species are endemic to New Zealand. The species generally grow in forests, swamps and amongst low alpine vegetation; occasionally they are epiphytic.

== Species ==
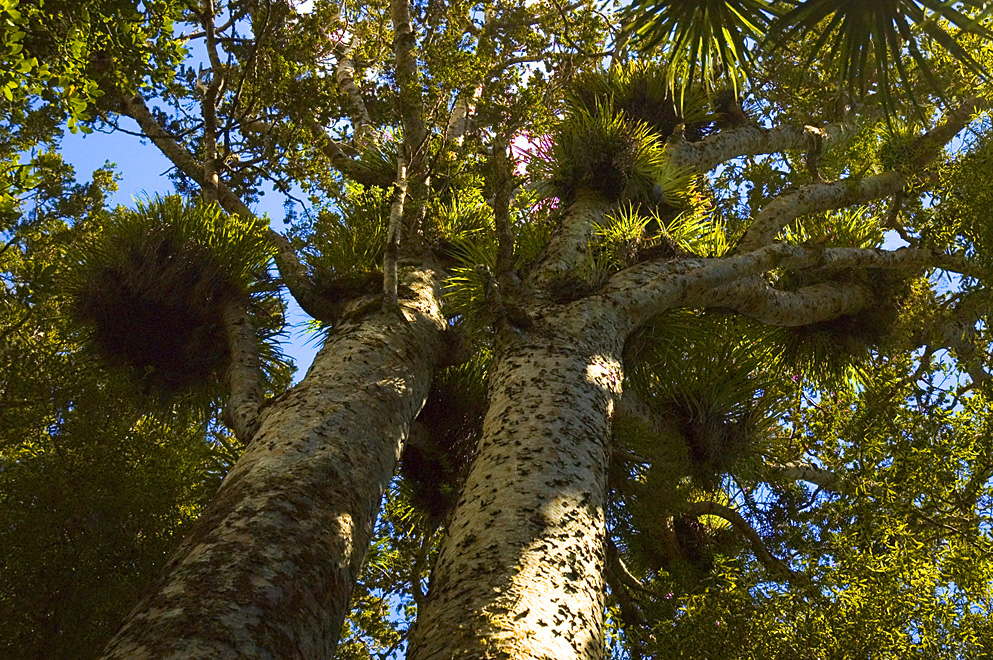
Astelia spp. growing on Agathis australis in Trounson Kauri Park, North Island, New Zealand

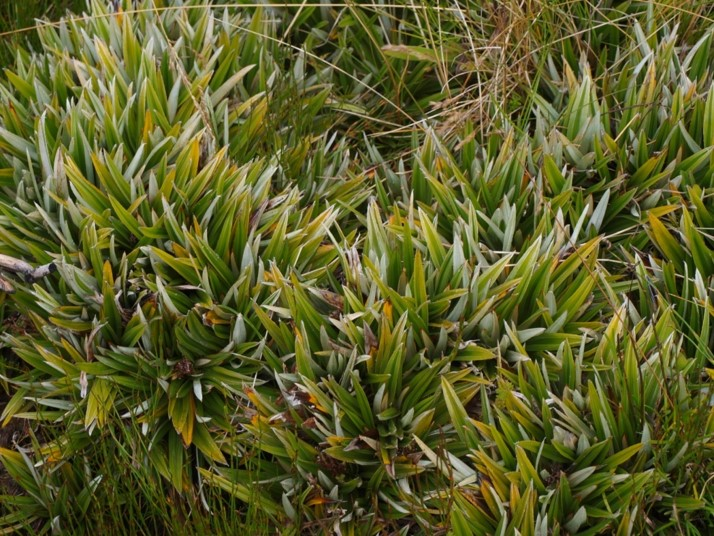
Astelia alpina

The genus is divided into a number of subgenera and these are further divided into sections. These contain the following species:

- subgenus Astelia
  - section Astelia
    - Astelia alpina R.Br. - Pineapple Grass, Silver Astelia, native to eastern Australia
      - Astelia alpina var. alpina
      - Astelia alpina var. novae-hollandiae Skottsb.
    - Astelia papuana Skottsb.- native to New Guinea
    - Astelia linearis Hook.f.- native to North and South Islands of New Zealand
      - Astelia linearis var. linearis
      - Astelia linearis var. novae-zelandiae Skottsb.
    - Astelia subulata (Hook.f.) Cheesem. - native to South Island + Antipodean Islands of New Zealand
  - section Palaeastelia Skottsb.
    - Astelia hemichrysa (Lam.) Kunth - native to Réunion + Mauritius
- subgenus Asteliopsis Skottsb.
  - section Desmoneuron Skottsb.
    - Astelia solandri A.Cunn. - native to North and South Islands of New Zealand
    - Astelia trinervia Kirk - native to North Island and north-west South Island of New Zealand
    - Astelia nadeaudii Drake - native to Tahiti + Raiatea in French Polynesia
    - Astelia raiateensis J.W.Moore - see Astelia nadeaudii
  - section Isoneuron Skottsb.
    - Astelia banksii A.Cunn. - Native to North Island of New Zealand
    - Astelia neocaledonica Schltr. - endemic to New Caledonia.
- subgenus Collospermum Skottsb.
    - Astelia hastata Colenso - New Zealand - formerly Collospermum hastatum (Colenso) Skottsb.
    - Astelia microsperma Colenso - North Island of New Zealand - formerly Collospermum microspermum (Colenso) Skottsb.
    - Astelia montana Seem. - Fiji and Vanuatu - formerly Collospermum montanum (Seem.) Skottsb.
    - Astelia samoense (Skottsb.) Birch - Samoa - formerly Collospermum samoense Skottsb.
    - Astelia spicata Colenso, formerly Collospermum spicatum (Colenso) Skottsb., would fall into this subgenus but was rejected by Birch as a species.
- subgenus Tricella Skottsb.
  - section Tricella Skottsb.
    - Astelia australiana (J.H.Willis) L.B.Moore - Tall Astelia, native to the State of Victoria in Australia
    - Astelia chathamica (Skottsb.) L.B.Moore - Silver Spear, native to Chatham Islands of New Zealand
    - Astelia fragrans Col. - Bush Flax, Bush Lily, Kakaha, native to North and South Islands of New Zealand
    - Astelia graminea L.B.Moore- native to northern South Island of New Zealand
    - Astelia grandis Hook.f. ex Kirk- native to North and South Islands of New Zealand
    - Astelia nervosa Banks & Sol. ex Hook.f.- Mountain Astelia, native to North and South Islands of New Zealand
    - Astelia nivicola Ckn. ex Cheesem. - native to South Island of New Zealand
      - Astelia nivicola var. nivicola
      - Astelia nivicola var. moriceae L.B.Moore
    - Astelia petriei Ckn. - native to South Island of New Zealand
    - Astelia psychrocharis F.Muell. - Kosciusko Pineapple Grass, native to Mt. Kosciusko in Australia
    - Astelia skottsbergii L.B.Moore - native to north-west South Island of New Zealand
  - section Periastelia Skottsb.
    - Astelia argyrocoma A.Heller ex Skottsb. - native to Kauai Island in Hawaii
    - Astelia menziesiana Sm. in A.Rees - native to Hawaii
    - Astelia rapensis Skottsb. - native to Rapa-Iti Island in French Polynesia
    - Astelia tovii F.Br. - Marquesas in French Polynesia
    - Astelia waialealae Wawra - native to Kauai Island in Hawaii
  - section Micrastelia Skottsb.
    - Astelia pumila (J.R.Forst.) Gaudich. - native to western Patagonia, Tierra del Fuego and Falkland Islands
