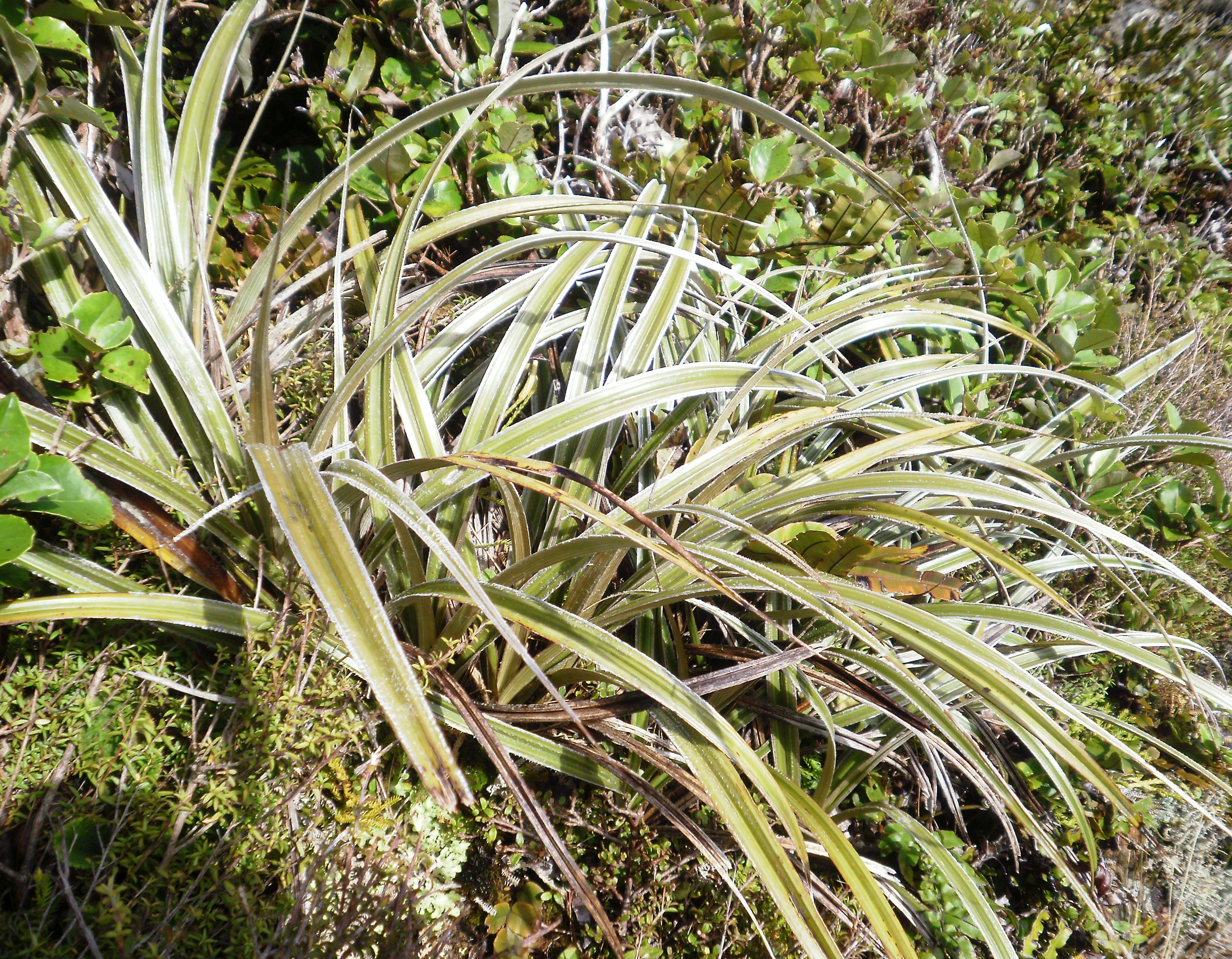

Scientific classification
- Kingdom: Plantae
- Clade: Tracheophytes
- Clade: Angiosperms
- Clade: Monocots
- Order: Asparagales
- Family: Asteliaceae
- Genus: Astelia
- Species: A. nervosa

Binomial name
- Astelia nervosa Banks & Sol. ex Hook.f.

Synonyms
- Funckia nervosa (Banks & Sol. ex Hook.f.) Kuntze; Astelia bivittata J.Watson; Astelia cockaynei Cheeseman; Astelia montana (Kirk ex Cheeseman) Cockayne nom. illeg. Astelia nervosa var. montana Kirk ex Cheeseman

= Astelia nervosa =

Species of flowering plant

Astelia nervosa, also known as mountain astelia or, along with a number of other species, as bush flax, is a herbaceous plant native to New Zealand. A. nervosa has long, flexible, leathery leaves that are light green and grey in colour. The flowers are light brown to red in colour. The mature fruits are generally orange.

It is found in lowland to low alpine areas from the southern North Island south to Stewart Island.

== Description ==
Astelia nervosa is described as an upright, clump-forming perennial, often forming large colonies. The plant is dioecious and robust, growing up to 180 cm high. It has an average height of 70 cm at full size.

Its leaves arch downwards gracefully, darkening in the colder winter months. The leaves are of firm texture, and they are keeled strongly above the sheath at the base of the leaf. These help provide structural support, protection for developing shoots, and wrap around the stem. The upper surface of the leaf is green and covered in scales that form a smooth, slightly transparent layer that hides the green colour. The leaf underside often features zigzag patterns formed by the feeding habits of the Astelia zigzag moth. Each leaf has a strong central ridge above the base, which can be up to 8 cm wide and is covered in thick scales.

Reddish-brown flowers and orange berries attract birds and lizards. The flower stalk is about the same length as the flower clusters, standing upright and being mostly covered in scales. There are usually fewer than 12 of these flower clusters, either single of in groups of two-three. The plant has a compressed female inflorescence (a small cluster of pistillate flowers arranged on a plant's axis, specializing in seed production), meaning that these flower clusters are tightly packed and serve to make the clusters more noticeable to pollinators. These flowers are entirely odourless, and are covered in small, densely matted hairs. Astelia nervosa has small, tubular flowers and an absence of staminodial filaments, which are non-reproductive stamens within a flower.

== Taxonomy ==
Astelia nervosa was first described by Joseph Banks and Daniel Solander in Joseph Dalton Hooker's 1853 publication Botany of the Antarctic Voyage Volume 2. Flora Novae Zelandiae.

The genus name, Astelia, was first published in 1810 by R.Brown when describing the species Astelia alpina.

== Distribution ==
=== Natural global range ===
Astelia nervosa is endemic to New Zealand, specifically in the South Island and Stewart Island. The Astelia genus, however, occurs in Hawaii, New Caledonia, south-eastern Australia, and northern Papua New Guinea.

=== New Zealand range ===
Astelia nervosa is found on both Steward Island and the South Island of New Zealand. Similar individuals are found on the North Island but have greener leaves and may be constituted as a different, unnamed taxon. There are around 25 species of Astelia in New Zealand, mostly being native, but some coming from either Hawaii or Papua New Guinea. New Zealand is richer in Astelia flora than any other region and is likely the starting point of migration and development of the genus.

== Habitat ==
Usually found in the uplands but is an occasional hydrophyte. Astelia likes soil that does not dry out during growing season as they have a high need for moisture in the soil, and they prefer full sun to partial shade. The plant prefers locations with an average monthly rainfall of at least 100 cm. Astelias are typically found in forest locality with a surplus of fog because this is where they flourish. Humus soil where Astelia plants occur is almost always moist, and consists almost entirely of organic matter.

== Phenology ==
The berries from the plant are primarily dispersed by frugivores, which are animals that feed mostly on fruits. These animals can either disperse or destroy their seeds through digestion. Fruiting occurs from February to May. Astelia nervosa usually flowers from October to December.

== Other information ==
Adult Apis mellifera (Western honey bees) feed on and collect pollen and nectar from the plant. Astelia is an important source of food for native birds, including tuis and wood pigeons, as well as the lesser short-tailed bat, which is only found in New Zealand.

Astelia nervosa is currently classified as Not Threatened under the New Zealand Threat Classification System (NZTCS) as of 2024. This has not changed since its previous assessment back in 2004. The etymological meaning of the name Astelia is "stemless", while nervosa means "with conspicuous veins".

The chromosome number is n = 105.
