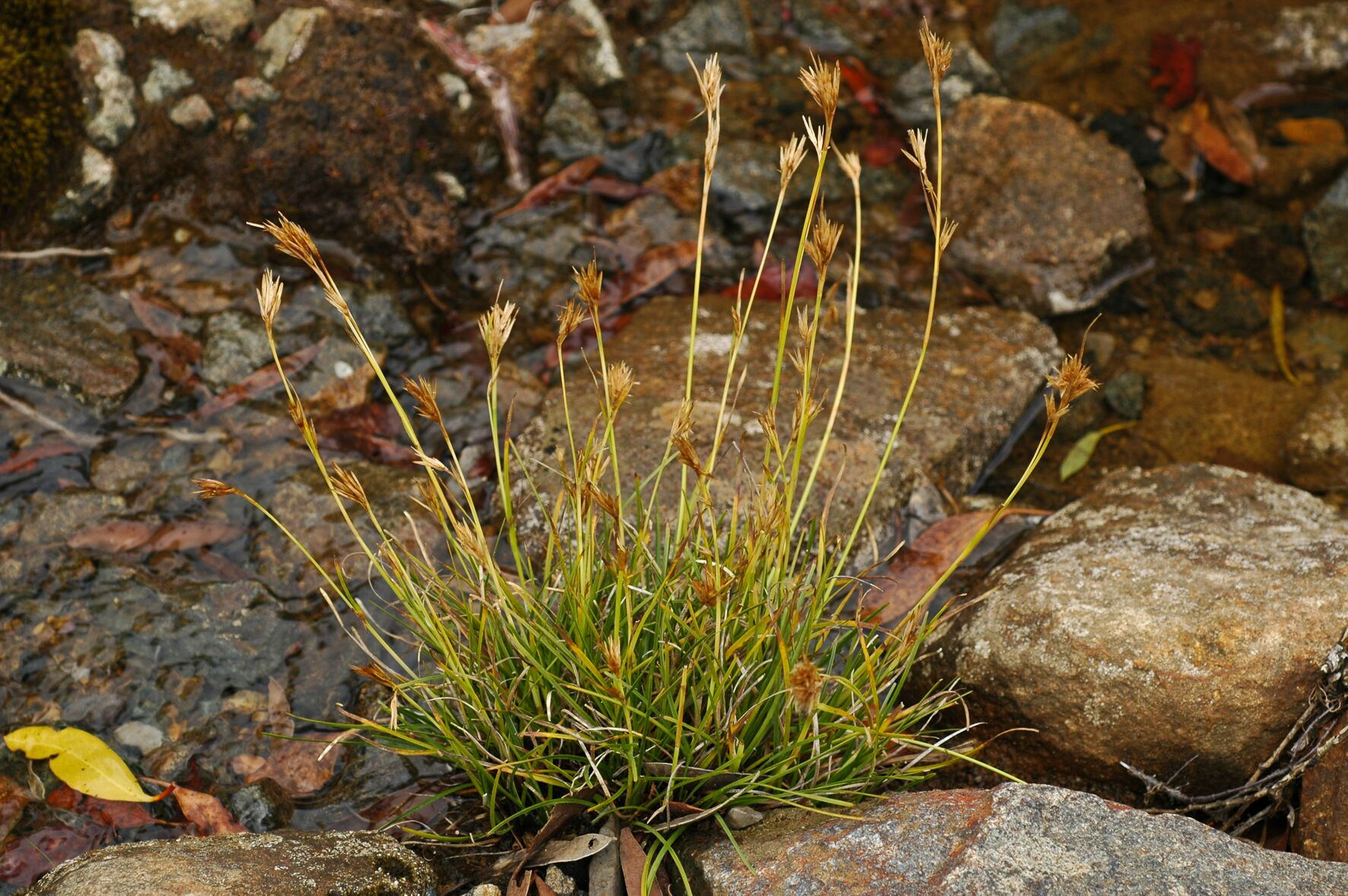

Scientific classification
- Kingdom: Plantae
- Clade: Tracheophytes
- Clade: Angiosperms
- Clade: Monocots
- Clade: Commelinids
- Order: Poales
- Family: Cyperaceae
- Genus: Carpha
- Species: C. alpina

Binomial name
- Carpha alpina R.Br.

= Carpha alpina =

Species of grass-like plant

Carpha alpina, commonly known as small flower-rush, is a tufted perennial sedge from the family Cyperaceae. It is found primarily in south-east Australia and both islands of New Zealand, but also in Papua New Guinea.

== Description ==
Carpha alpina grows as a short rhizomatous tufted perennial sedge. It has rigid, striated culms that are glabrous and can grow between 2-10 cm tall and 0.7-1.5 mm wide. The numerous grey-green or red-green leaf-blades are stiff and flattened, with a yellow-brown sheath and a width ranging from 0.5-2 mm. The inflorescence is made up of 1-3 loose clusters ranging from 1-10 cm long with singular or paired bracts slightly longer than the inflorescence. The spikelets are between 8-10 mm long and arranged in clusters of 2-10. The brown, acute and keeling glumes are separated into upper and lower parts, with the lowest 2 or 3 empty and half the size of the upper glumes. The upper glumes are larger - 8-9 mm long, with a bristlelike glume above; the bristles are 7-10 mm long and red or brown in colour. The fruit is a nut, 2.5-3 mm long, brown in colour and narrow-ellipsoid in shape. The nut has a short stipe and is crowned by the rigid smooth or slightly hairy 3-5 mm long style-base.

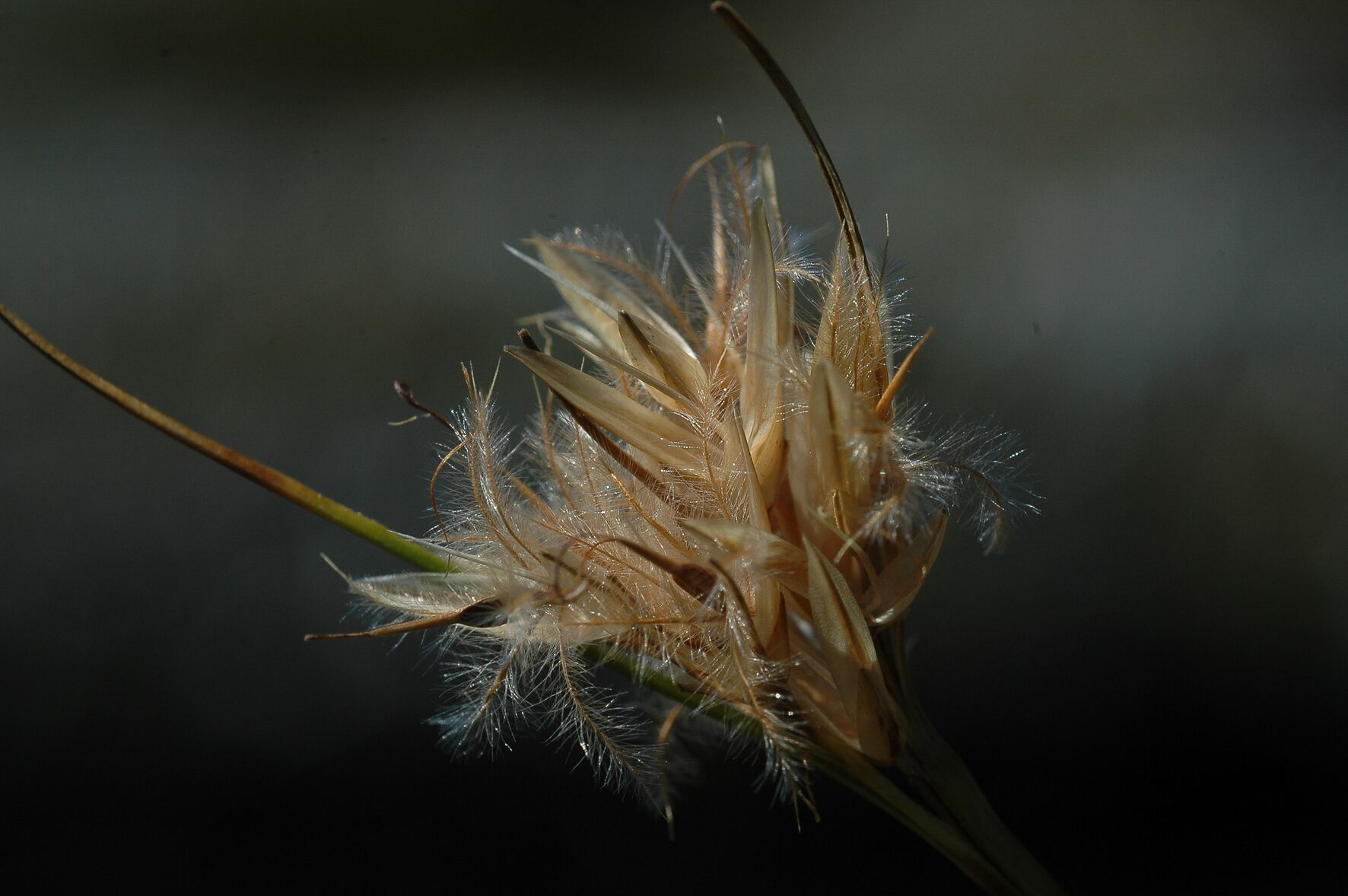
The flowerhead of a Carpha alpina sedge

== Distribution and habitat ==
Carpha alpina is widespread throughout the montane and subalpine areas of Tasmania as well as in mountainous regions of Victoria and New South Wales in Australia. It is also found in New Zealand and Papua New guinea, primarily in mountainous areas. Its habitat includes coastal to alpine bogs, mires, wet alpine and subalpine areas where it can colonize areas disturbed by environmental factors.

== Taxonomy ==
Carpha alpina was first described by Robert Brown after he sailed to Tasmania aboard the Lady Nelson in 1803. It has some resemblance to the grasses of the Rytidosperma genus, however, the flat grey-green or red-green leaves, combined with the lack of lemma and palea on the flowers, and the distinctive stipitate nut; differentiate it from those species.
