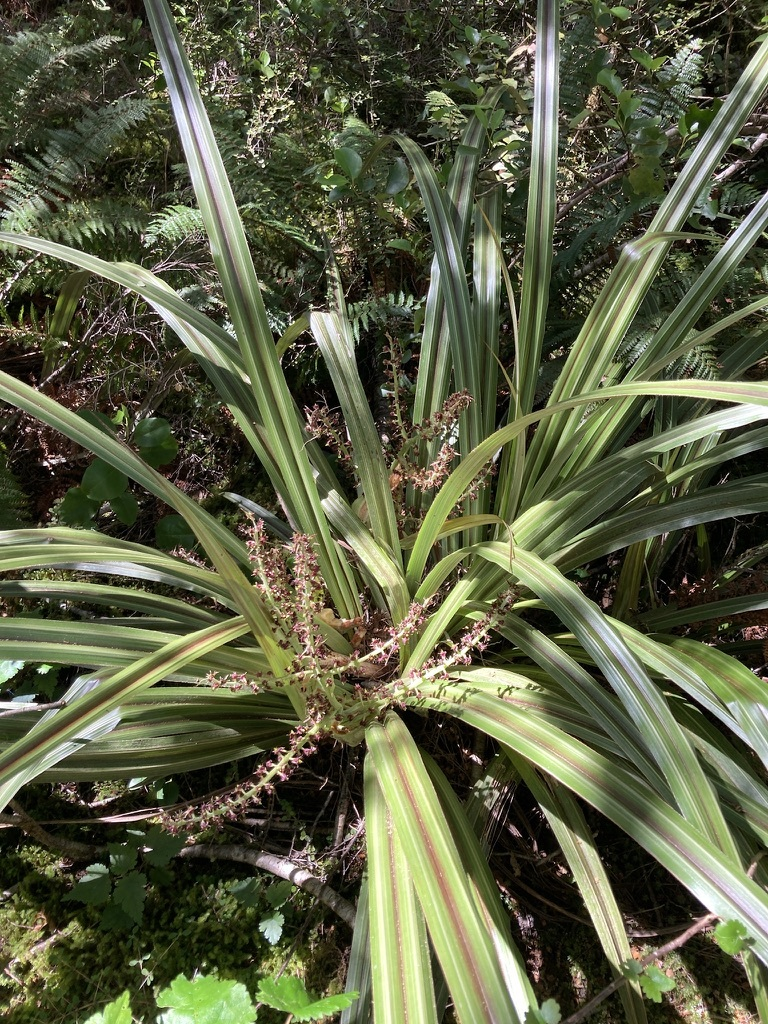
- Astelia fragrans at Fantail Falls, Haast Pass, New Zealand

Scientific classification
- Kingdom: Plantae
- Clade: Tracheophytes
- Clade: Angiosperms
- Clade: Monocots
- Order: Asparagales
- Family: Asteliaceae
- Genus: Astelia
- Species: A. fragrans

Binomial name
- Astelia fragrans Colenso

= Astelia fragrans =

Species of flowering plant

Astelia fragrans, commonly known as bush lily, bush flax or kakaha, is the most common Astelia species found in New Zealand. It grows from sea level to elevations of approximately 900 metres.

A. fragrans has long, sword-like green leaves, with midribs that can be red. In the centre of the plant, clumps of green flowers are produced between October and November. During summer, yellow-orange fruit is produced by the plant.

It was first described by William Colenso in 1883.
