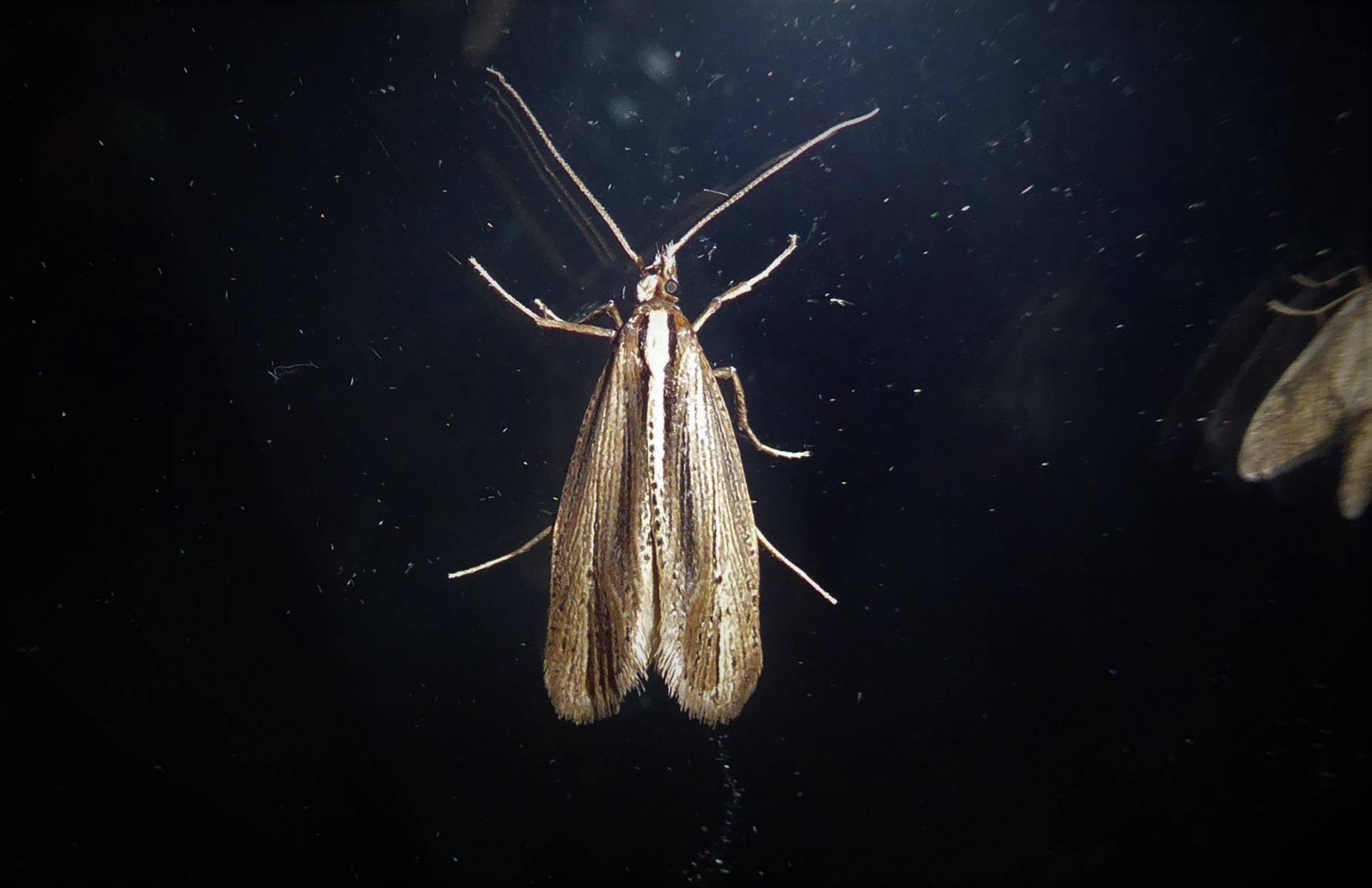

Scientific classification
- Kingdom: Animalia
- Phylum: Arthropoda
- Clade: Pancrustacea
- Class: Insecta
- Order: Lepidoptera
- Family: Plutellidae
- Genus: Proditrix
- Species: P. megalynta

Binomial name
- Proditrix megalynta (Meyrick, 1915)

Synonyms
- Plutella megalynta Meyrick, 1915

= Proditrix megalynta =

Species of moth endemic to New Zealand

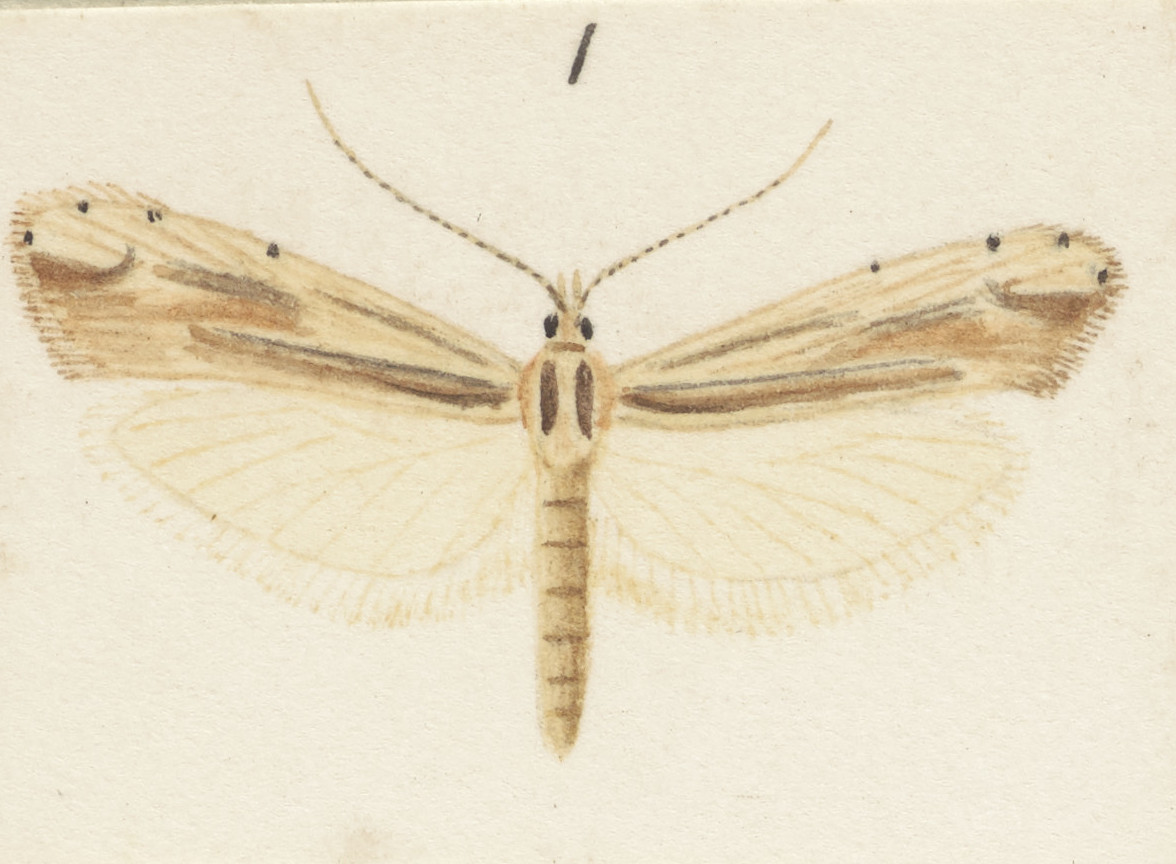
Illustration by George Hudson

Proditrix megalynta is a species of moth in the family Glyphipterigidae first described by Edward Meyrick in 1915. It is endemic to New Zealand.

== Taxonomy ==
This species was first described by Edward Meyrick in 1915 using a specimen collected by George Howes in Otago or Southland in November and named Plutella megalynta.

== Description ==
Meyrick described this species as follows:

♂. 34 mm. Head ochreous-whitish, sides of crown dark brown, hairs projecting on forehead. Palpi ochreous-whitish, second joint brownish-ochreous except apical edge, tuft long, rough, terminal joint much shorter than second. Antennae whitish-ochreous, ciliation 1, basal joint dark brown, without flap of scales. Thorax brown, with broad ochreous-whitish dorsal stripe and dark- fuscous stripe on each side of it. Abdomen whitish-grey-ochreous. Forewings elongate, rather narrow, posteriorly slightly dilated, costa gently arched, apex obtuse, termen nearly straight, rather oblique; pale brownish-ochreous, more brownish-tinged in disc and towards dorsum, obscurely streaked with ochreous-whitish suffusion between veins; a narrow ochreous-white dorsal streak from base to 2/3, edged above with dark-fuscous suffusion anteriorly; an irregular brownish median longitudinal streak from middle of disc to termen, with some blackish scales in longitudinal lines; some dark-brown dots round posterior part of costa and termen : cilia light-brownish, at apex and on costa ochreous-whitish. Hindwings with 3 and 4 approximated at base; ochreous - grey - whitish : cilia concolorous.

== Distribution ==
This species is endemic to New Zealand.

== Behaviour ==
Adults of this species are attracted to light.
