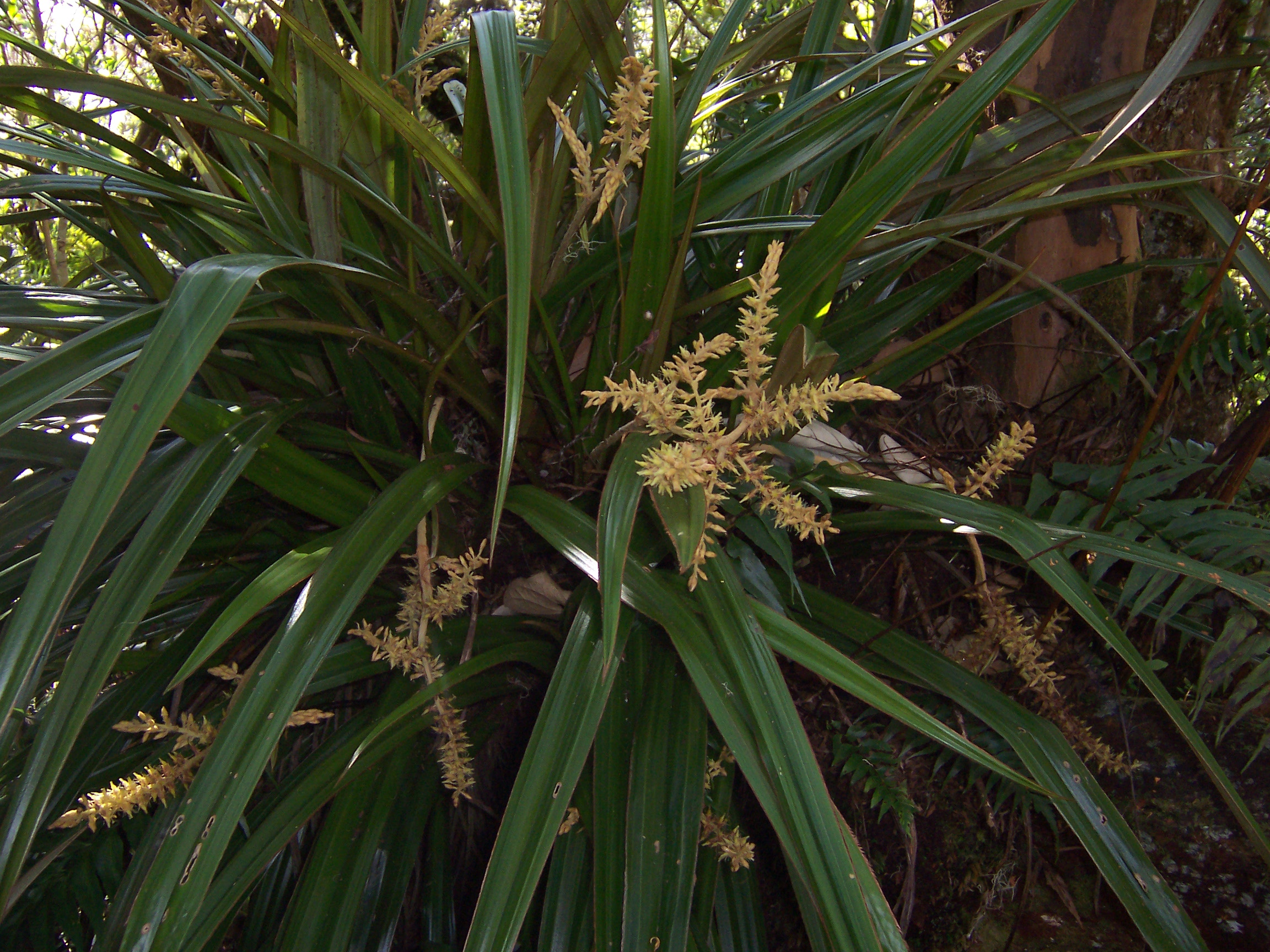
- Astelia hemichrysa

Scientific classification
- Kingdom: Plantae
- Clade: Tracheophytes
- Clade: Angiosperms
- Clade: Monocots
- Order: Asparagales
- Family: Asteliaceae; Dumort.

Genera
- See text

= Asteliaceae =

Family of flowering plants

Asteliaceae is a family of flowering plants, placed in the order Asparagales of the monocots.

The family has only recently been recognized by taxonomists. The APG III system of 2009 (unchanged from the 1998 and 2003 versions) does recognize this family. The family includes three genera with about 38 species, occurring in the Southern Hemisphere. It is bird/insect pollinated and its conservation status as of 2017 is not threatened.

== Description ==
A large variation in morphology is seen within this family.

=== Roots ===
The main cell type of the vascular tissue system present in roots are tracheids. Roots are the only plant organs to have vessel elements and this is seen commonly in Monocots. The habitat of a monocot will determine different xylem characteristics. The habitat of Asteliaceae gives rise to the variation seen in the xylem. These tracheary elements have pores in their walls from fragments of the pit membrane. The vessels that are present within Asteliaceae have very primitive perforation plates.

Rhizomes in Astelia create large intermingled structures that overtake the surrounding environment and vegetation.

=== Leaves ===
Leaves in Asteliaceae are long, slender, and alternately arranged.

A rare, unique trait in Asteliaceae is leaf hairs that are silver and white. They are usually present in this family and are distinct with branching so they are easy to notice.

No vessel elements are found in the leaves of this family. The only xylem cell type present is tracheids.

=== Stems ===
In comparison to roots, the tracheids present in the stems are less porous and therefore have less pit membranes. Additionally, stems in Asteliaceae do not have vessel elements.

=== Flowers and reproduction ===
Flowers in Asteliaceae are typically dioecious but it varies depending on the genus. Milligania and Neoastelia have perfect bisexual flowers while Astelia (including Collospermum) usually have imperfect unisexual flowers. One Astelia species in specific produces both female flowers and imperfect flowers together in the same population.

Inflorescence in this family is always terminal and has a branched cluster of flowers but the variation in this category is wide, particularly with unisexual inflorescences. There is a large, leaf-like sheathing bract that surrounds and encloses the flower cluster. Typically, the distinct hairs on the leaves can also be seen on the inflorescence and flowers.

Asteliaceae has either a sterile pistil or a pistil with a superior ovary, one short or inconspicuous style, and a three lobed stigma. Stamens in Asteliaceae either have dorsifixed or basifixed anthers.

The number of locules in the ovary varies in each genus. Astelia usually has three locules, but it also can have a single locule. Even within the genus Neoastelia, there can be between three and seven locules.

=== Fruits and seeds ===
Usually, fruits in Asteliaceae are fleshy, as seen within the genera Astelia and Neoastelia. However, the fruits can also be dry capsules as seen in the genus Milligania.

Seed storage behaviour in Asteliaceae is quite odd as the seed is sensitive to freezing but this behaviour is not always seen. The smallest effect of this behaviour can be seen in the plants found growing in Hawaii.

== Taxonomy ==
The family Asteliaceae was created by Dumortier in 1829. In the APG IV system, the family is placed in the order Asparagales, part of the monocot clade. Within the Asparagales, it is placed in a basal group of families, which diverge after Orchidaceae, and is either sister to Hypoxidaceae or, in a 2021 study, to the clade Lanariaceae plus Hypoxidaceae:

- Asparagales
  - Orchidaceae
  - - - Boryaceae
      - - Blandfordiaceae
        - - Asteliaceae
          - - Lanariaceae
            - Hypoxidaceae
    - remaining Asparagales families

Within the family, studies in 2012 and 2013 grouped Milligania with Astelia. The 2021 study placed Neoastelia and Milligania as sisters:

- Asteliaceae
  - - Neoastelia
    - Milligania
  - Astelia

=== Genera ===
As of December 2021, Plants of the World Online accepts three genera:

- Astelia Banks & Sol. ex R.Br.
- Milligania Hook.f.
- Neoastelia J.B.Williams

The genus Collospermum has been synonymized with Astelia.

== Origin and diversity ==
Due to its prevalence on the eastern Gondwanan landmasses, Australia, New Zealand, and South America, the Asteliaceae family has been classified as an "Austral" floristic element. This idea is supported by the split of Milligania from other astelioid taxa, which is estimated to be 79 million years old, based on age estimations of 102 and 92 million years old for the stem and crown lineages. Long-distance overwater dispersal was likely involved in the spread of Asteliaceae across the Pacific, although little is known about the paths of such dispersal events. Astelia, which originated in New Zealand around 27.1 million years ago, is the largest and oldest genus in the family Asteliaceae. This is of note as the family Asteliaceae originated from Australia which is in proximity to New Zealand.

== Distribution ==
Asteliaceae has a very wide distribution of species that live near large bodies of water. They are found on continents in the southern hemisphere, while they are found in islands as well in the Pacific Ocean, Indian Ocean, Australia, and New Zealand. 30 of the 38 species in Asteliaceae are found in Australia, New Zealand, and Argentina which all border the South Pacific Ocean. The other 8 species are found to be living on archipelagos scattered around the Pacific Ocean and Indian Ocean, specifically in Fiji, Hawaii, and New Caledonia. Asteliaceae managed to disperse to both the Western and Eastern Pacific Islands as a result of direct and stepping-stone dispersion paths from New Zealand through Fiji and Hawaii, respectively.

Taxa within Asteliaceae are found in both the Austral and Pacific areas. However, New Zealand has been found to be the centre of genetic diversity, as three of the four genera of Asteliaceae have been found there. Interestingly, species diversity has also been found to be highest in New Zealand. Species within the genus Astelia have been discovered in Australia, New Zealand, South America, the Mascarene Islands in the Indian Ocean, and 7 archipelagos in the Pacific, showing that it is the biggest and most extensively dispersed of the four genera of Asteliaceae.

Species within the genus Astelia are able to live in many different habitats such as coastal and lowland woods, low level swamps, alpine fellfields, and high elevation bogs. Four Astelia species formerly placed in Collospermum grow as epiphytes in lowland forests in New Zealand and in lowland and tropical montane cloud forests in Fiji, Vanuatu, and Samoa. Milligania consists of 5 species that grow only in Tasmania. They grow in a variety of environments including lowland riparian valleys and alpine fellfields. Neoastelia is a genus made of just a single species of terrestrial herbs found only in temperate rainforests in northeastern New South Wales.

Although taxa within Asteliaceae are found across various Gondwanan landmasses, which include Australia, New Zealand, and South America, and the possible Cretaceous beginnings for the family, the Tertiary saw the emergence of new genera. Dispersion across long distances is the most likely hypothesis for the modern distribution for Asteliaceae.

A solitary fossilized pollen grain, perhaps belonging to the Asteliaceae family, has been discovered in Oligocene to Pliocene sediments on West Point Island in the Falkland Islands. This fossil pollen datum, which is classified as either "Astelia-type" or "Monosulcites sp. A.", might suggest the presence of Astelia in South America during the Tertiary period.

== Habitat ==
Different species of Asteliaceae favour different habitats. The range that Asteliaceae covers is extensive but typically an area with a constant supply of moisture will increase growth. Some prefer low habitats where cushion plants commonly grow, which encompasses areas like the subalpine, alpines, and bogs. One thing in common with all the species in this family is that they typically occupy tall and clustered habitats.

Unlike most plants, some species are epiphytic and this could be the main way the plant grows. Many species from the genus Astelia favour terrestrial and rock as a substrate to grow upon. If the epiphytic plant is detached from its source, it will find other ways to get moisture and nutrients. For example, if the plant fell on the ground, it would not be affected and would continue growing for a long duration of time.
