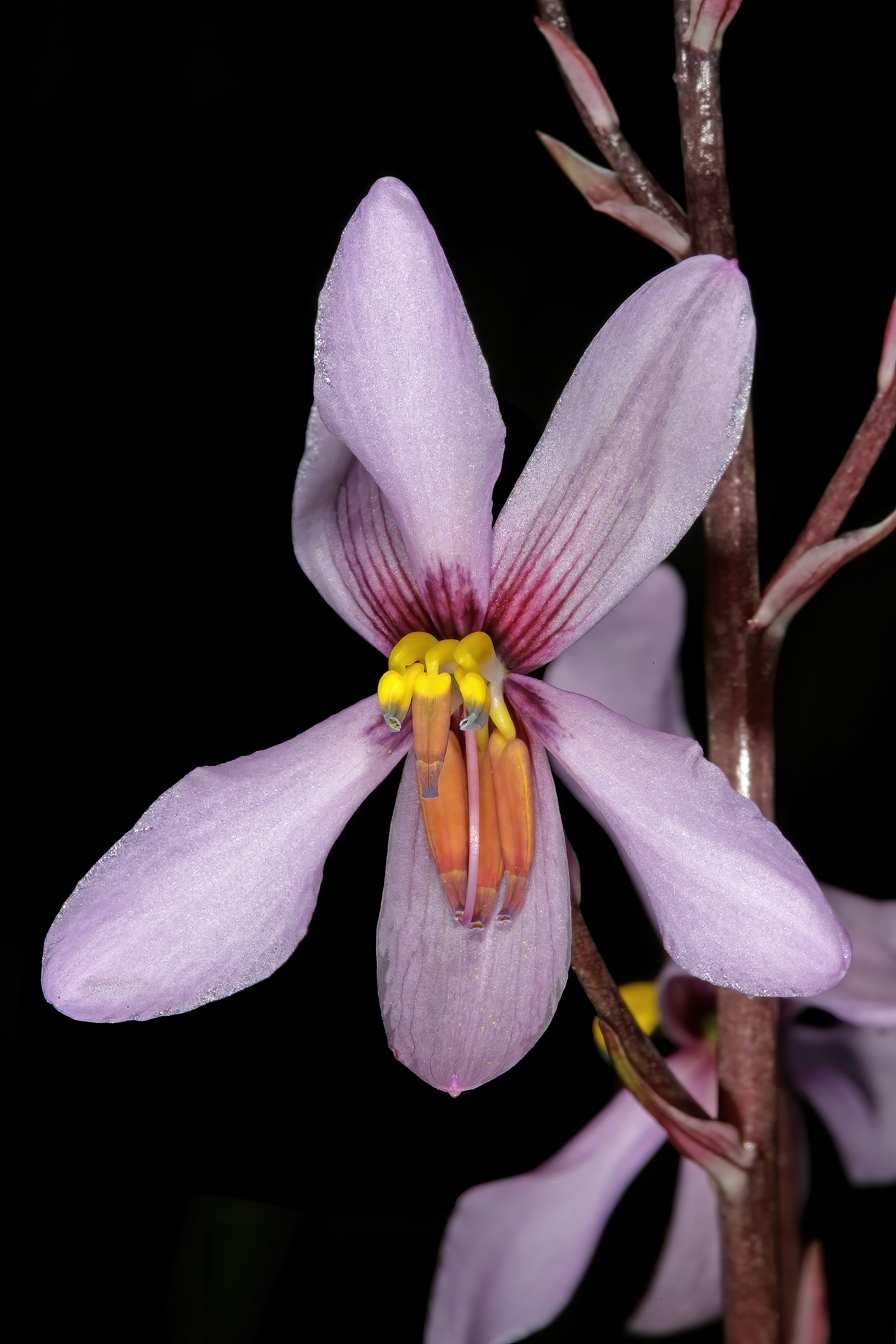

Scientific classification
- Kingdom: Plantae
- Clade: Tracheophytes
- Clade: Angiosperms
- Clade: Monocots
- Order: Asparagales
- Family: Tecophilaeaceae
- Genus: Cyanella
- Species: C. orchidiformis

Binomial name
- Cyanella orchidiformis Jacq.

Synonyms
- Trigella orchidiformis Salisb.

= Cyanella orchidiformis =

Species of flowering plant

Cyanella orchidiformis is a perennial flowering plant and geophyte belonging to the genus Cyanella. The plant is endemic to the Northern Cape and the Western Cape. It occurs from Steinkopf to Citrusdal. The plant blooms from July to September.
