= Cyanella aquatica =

Conservation status
- Vulnerable (IUCN 3.1)

Scientific classification
- Kingdom: Plantae
- Clade: Tracheophytes
- Clade: Angiosperms
- Clade: Monocots
- Order: Asparagales
- Family: Tecophilaeaceae
- Genus: Cyanella
- Species: C. aquatica

Binomial name
- Cyanella aquatica Oberm. ex G.Scott, (1991)

Species of flowering plant

Cyanella aquatica is a perennial flowering plant and geophyte belonging to the genus Cyanella and is part of the Renosterveld. The plant is endemic to the Northern Cape and occurs on the Bokkeveld escarpment. The plant's habitat is threatened by overgrazing and trampling by livestock as well as invasive plants.
