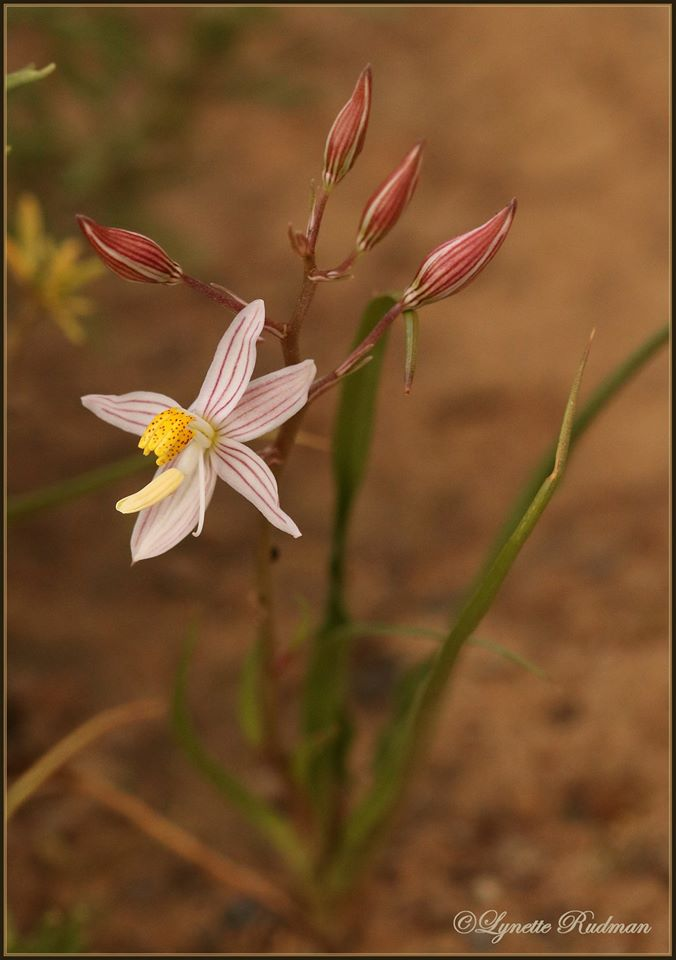
- Cyanella lutea subspecies rosea

Scientific classification
- Kingdom: Plantae
- Clade: Tracheophytes
- Clade: Angiosperms
- Clade: Monocots
- Order: Asparagales
- Family: Tecophilaeaceae
- Genus: Cyanella
- Species: C. lutea

Binomial name
- Cyanella lutea L.f.

= Cyanella lutea =

Species of flowering plant

Cyanella lutea (commonly known as "Five-fingers" or "Geelraaptol") is a species of cormous herb, native to South Africa (Cape Provinces and Free State) and southern Namibia, where it grows in clay-rich or loamy soils.

== Description ==
It has a flat basal rosette (plants reach a height of 25 cm) of 4-6 lanceolate, crisped (wavy margins), ribbed leaves. The rosette of leaves usually dies off, before the flowers appear.

The yellow or pink flowers are 15mm wide and appear on a branched inflorescence in late Spring.

=== Subspecies ===
- subsp. lutea occurs in rocky clay, shale or limestone soils in the Western Cape Province, from the Bokkeveld mountains in the north, to Cape Town in the west, and eastwards through the Little Karoo and Overberg regions as far as the Kouga mountains in the Eastern Cape Province.
- subsp. rosea occurs in dry sandy or calcareous soils to the east and far north (Eastern Cape Province, Northern Cape Province, Free State, and southern Namibia.
