= Cyanella marlothii =

Scientific classification
- Kingdom: Plantae
- Clade: Tracheophytes
- Clade: Angiosperms
- Clade: Monocots
- Order: Asparagales
- Family: Tecophilaeaceae
- Genus: Cyanella
- Species: C. marlothii

Binomial name
- Cyanella marlothii J.C.Manning & Goldblatt

Species of flowering plant

Cyanella marlothii is a species of flowering plant in the family Tecophilaeaceae. It is a perennial geophyte. The plant is endemic to the Northern Cape. It occurs in the Richtersveld just west of Ploegberg. There is only one population of less than 50 plants that is threatened by overgrazing.
