= Marie Cornu =

Marie Cornu may refer to:

- Marie Alfred Cornu (1841–1902), French physicist
- Marie Maxime Cornu (1843–1901), French botanist and mycologist
