= Cyanella ramosissima =

Scientific classification
- Kingdom: Plantae
- Clade: Tracheophytes
- Clade: Angiosperms
- Clade: Monocots
- Order: Asparagales
- Family: Tecophilaeaceae
- Genus: Cyanella
- Species: C. ramosissima

Binomial name
- Cyanella ramosissima (Engl. & K.Krause) Engl. & K.Krause

Synonyms
- Iphigenia ramosissima Engl. & Krause; Cyanella krauseana Dinter & G.M.Schulze

Species of flowering plant

Cyanella ramosissima is a perennial flowering plant and geophyte belonging to the genus Cyanella. The plant is native to Namibia and the Northern Cape. It occurs from the central Richtersveld and extends northwards to the mountain range just south of Aus in southern Namibia. Six subpopulations are known and the plant is threatened by overgrazing and trampling by livestock.
