= Serrated tortoise (disambiguation) =

Serrated tortoise may refer to:

- Kinixys erosa is a species of turtle in the family Testudinidae
- Psammobates oculifer
