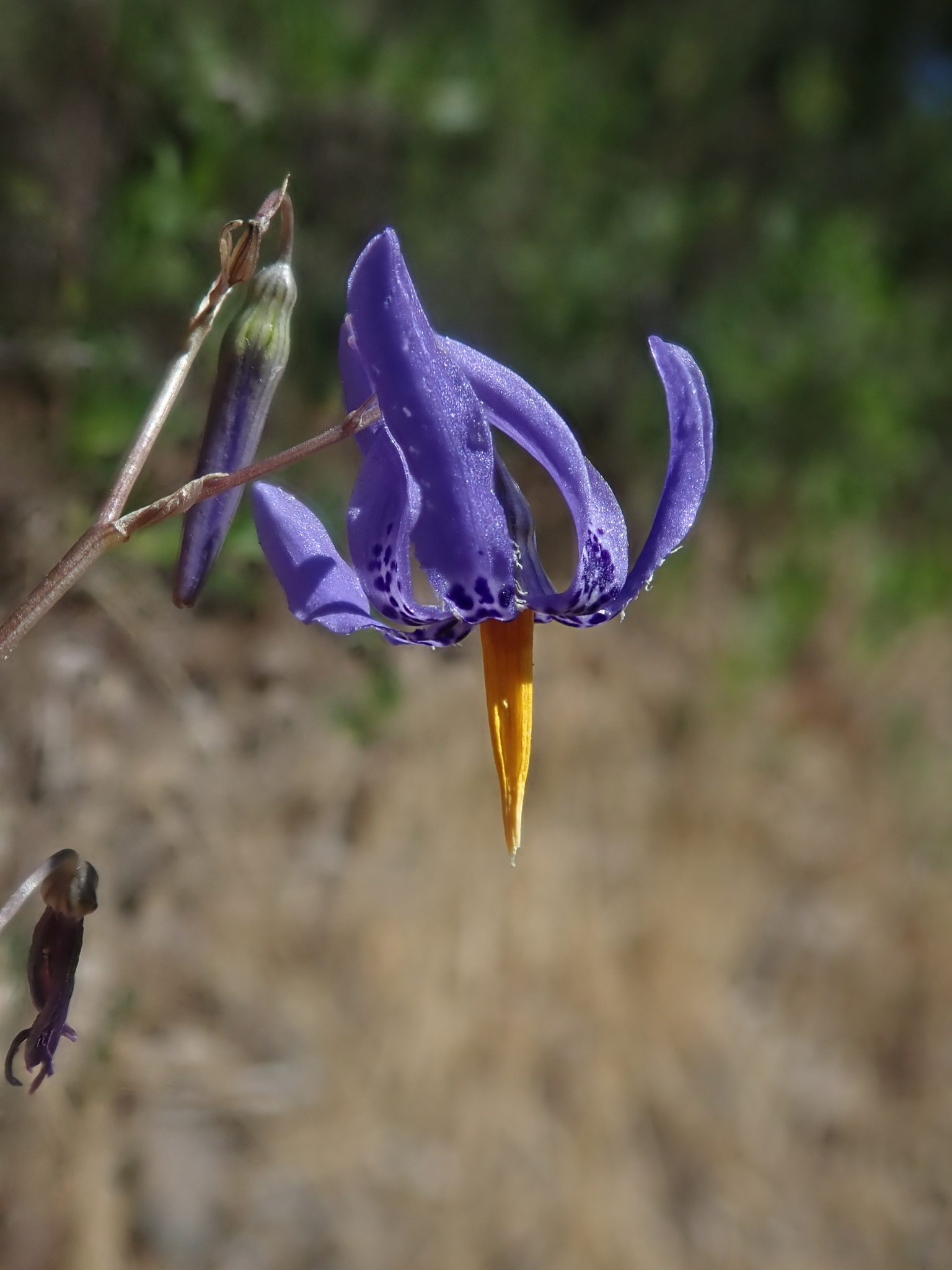

Scientific classification
- Kingdom: Plantae
- Clade: Tracheophytes
- Clade: Angiosperms
- Clade: Monocots
- Order: Asparagales
- Family: Tecophilaeaceae
- Genus: Conanthera
- Species: C. bifolia

Binomial name
- Conanthera bifolia Ruiz & Pav.

Synonyms
- Sisyrinchium illmu Molina; Conanthera passeriflora Ravenna; Conanthera passeriflora f. coelestis Ravenna; Conanthera passeriflora f. immaculata Ravenna; Conanthera passeriflora f. lilacina Ravenna; Conanthera passeriflora f. melananthera Ravenna; Conanthera passeriflora f. nocticolor Ravenna; Cummingia andica Raf.

= Conanthera bifolia =

Species of flowering plant

Conanthera bifolia is a species of flowering plant in the family Tecophilaeaceae. As all other members of the genus Conanthera, the species is endemic to Chile. It is distributed from the Valparaíso to Araucanía regions.
