= Walleria mackenziei =

Scientific classification
- Kingdom: Plantae
- Clade: Tracheophytes
- Clade: Angiosperms
- Clade: Monocots
- Order: Asparagales
- Family: Tecophilaeaceae
- Genus: Walleria
- Species: W. mackenziei

Binomial name
- Walleria mackenziei J.Kirk

Synonyms
- Walleria angolensis Baker

Species of flowering plant

Walleria mackenziei is a perennial flowering plant belonging to the genus Walleria. The species is native to Angola, Democratic Republic of the Congo, Malawi, Mozambique, Tanzania and Zambia.
