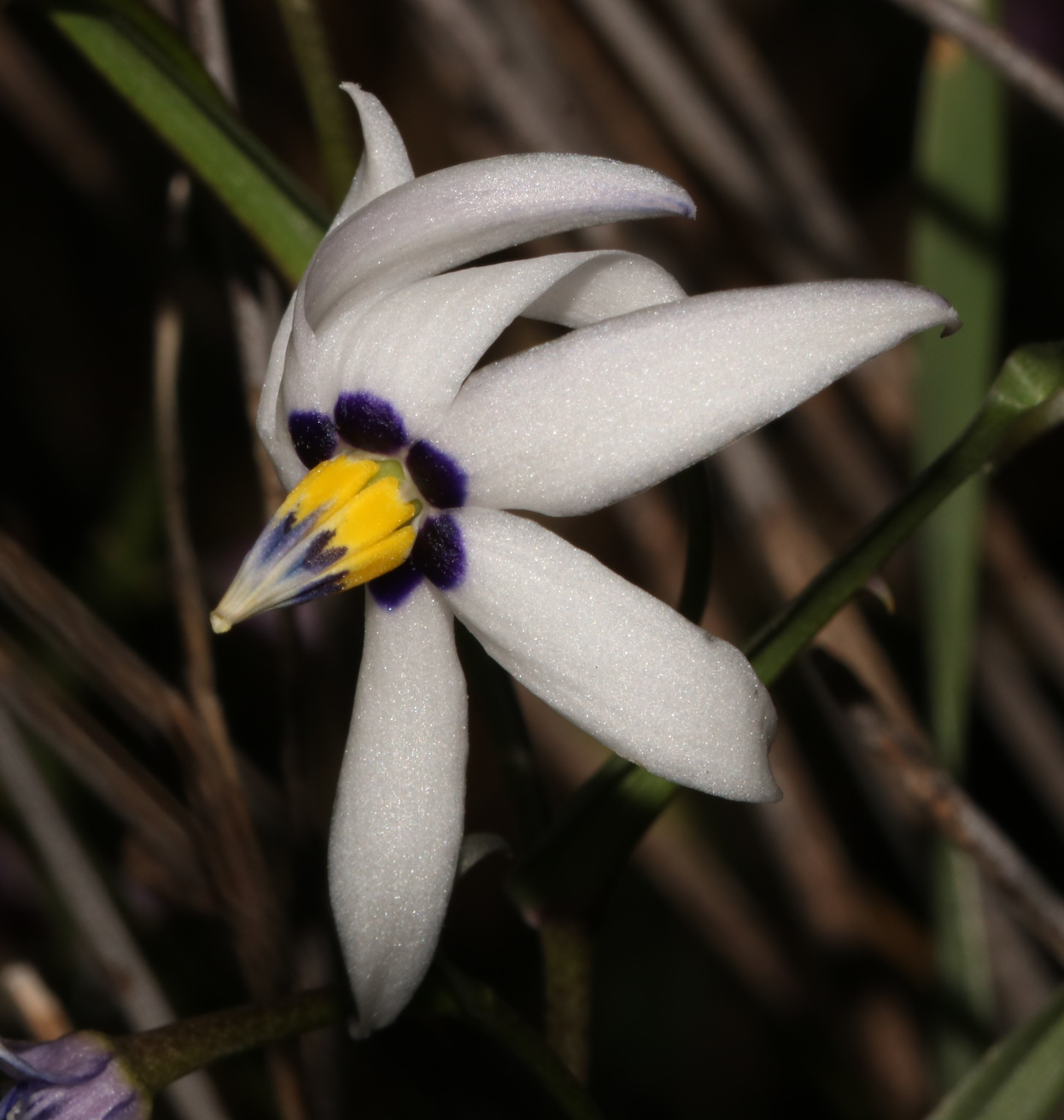

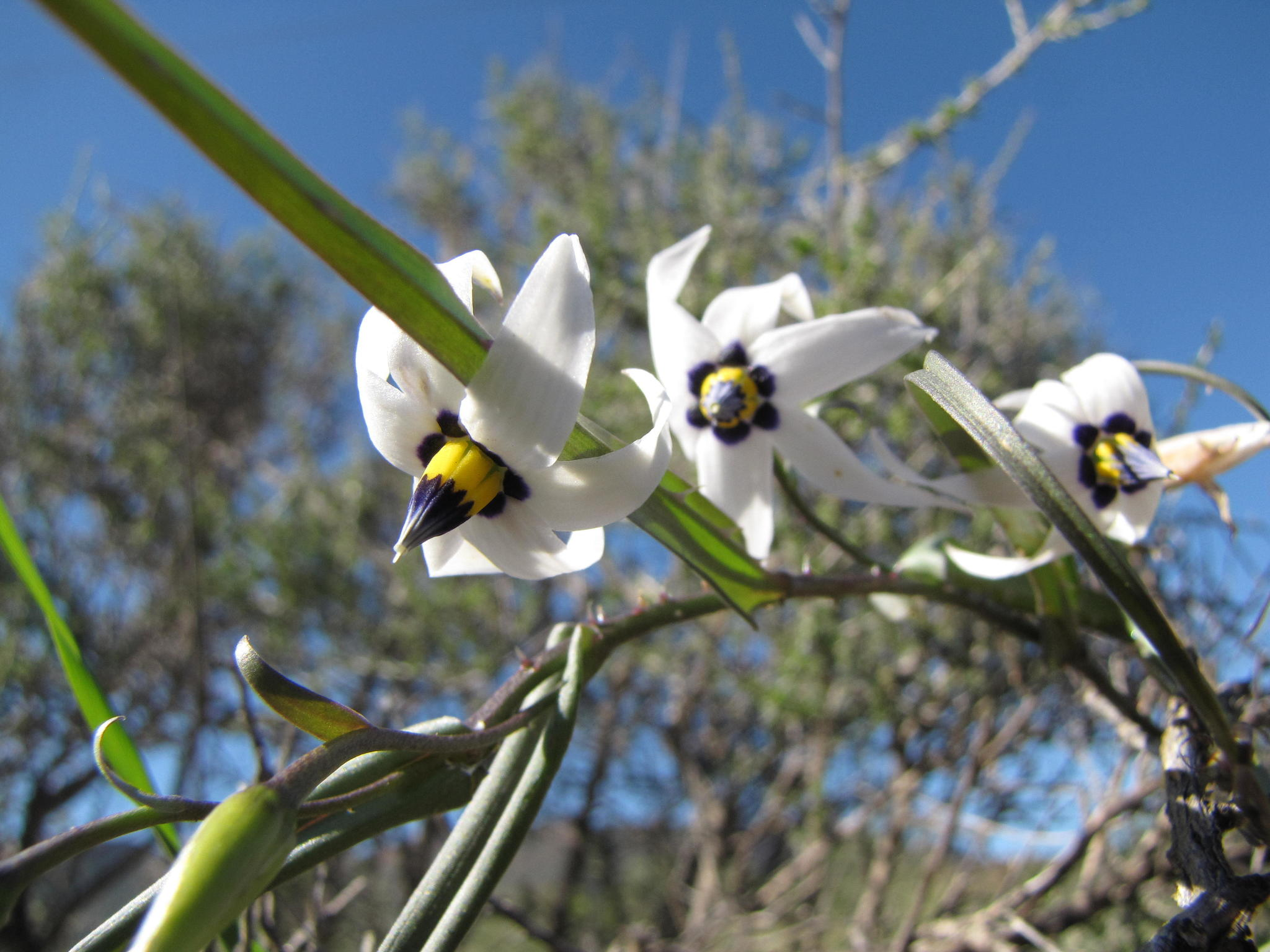

Scientific classification
- Kingdom: Plantae
- Clade: Tracheophytes
- Clade: Angiosperms
- Clade: Monocots
- Order: Asparagales
- Family: Tecophilaeaceae
- Genus: Walleria
- Species: W. gracilis

Binomial name
- Walleria gracilis (Salisb.) S.Carter

Synonyms
- Androsyne gracilis Salisb.; Walleria armata Schltr. & K.Krause

= Walleria gracilis =

Species of flowering plant

Walleria gracilis is a perennial flowering plant belonging to the genus Walleria. The species is native to the Western Cape and occurs in the Olifants River Valley between Klawer and Clanwilliam as well as Namibia. The plant has a range of 314 km² and is threatened by development and agricultural activities.
