= Cyanella pentheri =

Scientific classification
- Kingdom: Plantae
- Clade: Tracheophytes
- Clade: Angiosperms
- Clade: Monocots
- Order: Asparagales
- Family: Tecophilaeaceae
- Genus: Cyanella
- Species: C. pentheri

Binomial name
- Cyanella pentheri Zahlbr.

Species of flowering plant

Cyanella pentheri is a perennial flowering plant and geophyte belonging to the genus Cyanella and is part of the fynbos. The plant is endemic to the Northern Cape and the Western Cape. It occurs in the Bokkeveld Escarpment, Biedouw and the Olifants River Valley and has an area of occurrence of 4 368 km^{2}.
