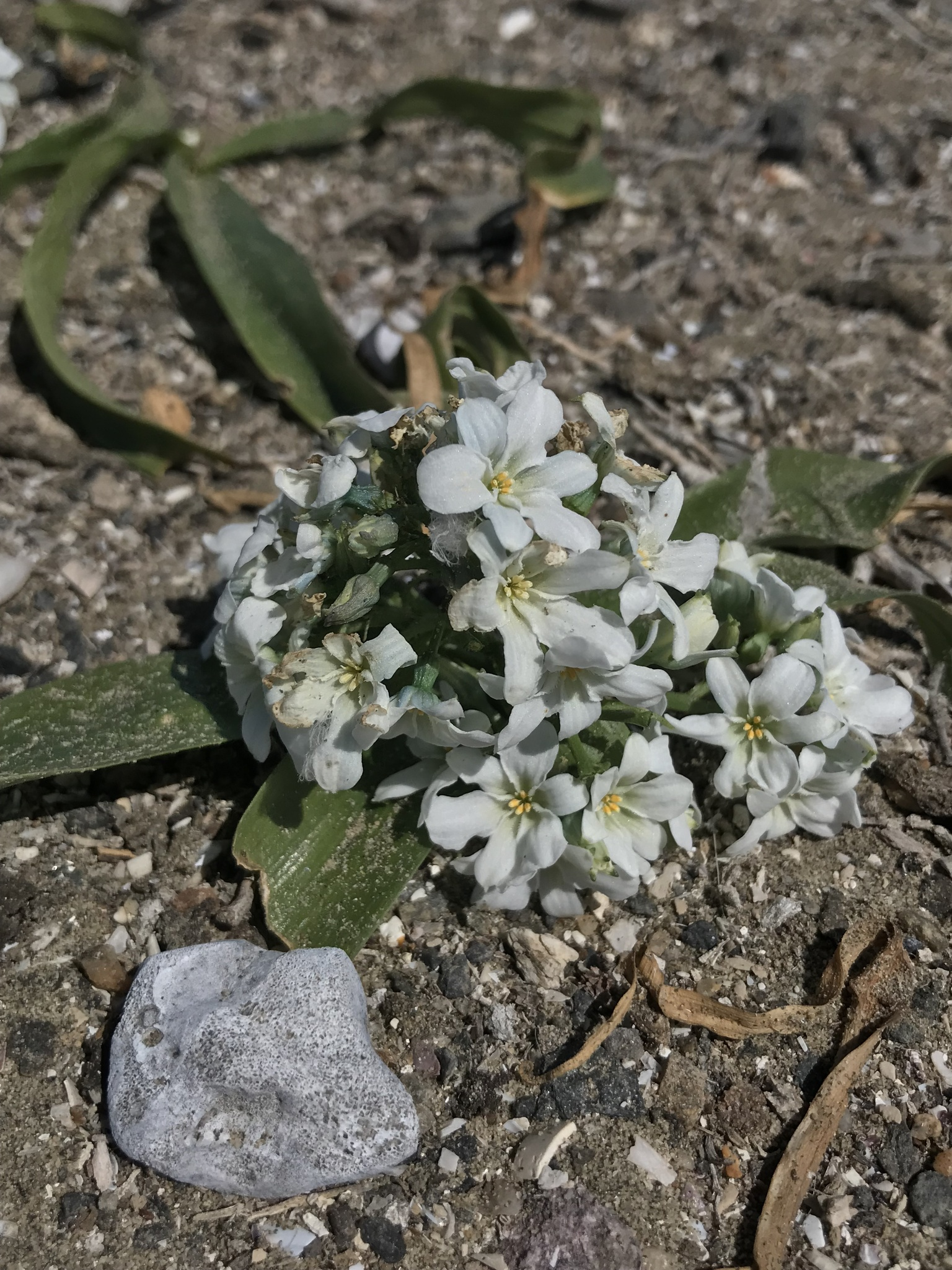

Scientific classification
- Kingdom: Plantae
- Clade: Tracheophytes
- Clade: Angiosperms
- Clade: Monocots
- Order: Asparagales
- Family: Tecophilaeaceae
- Genus: Zephyra
- Species: Z. compacta

Binomial name
- Zephyra compacta C.Ehrh.

= Zephyra compacta =

Species of plant

Zephyra compacta is a species of flowering plant in the family Tecophilaeaceae, being one of the two species in the genus Zephyra alongside Zephyra elegans. It is a perennial herb endemic to Chile and it is found in the northern regions of Atacama and Coquimbo.
