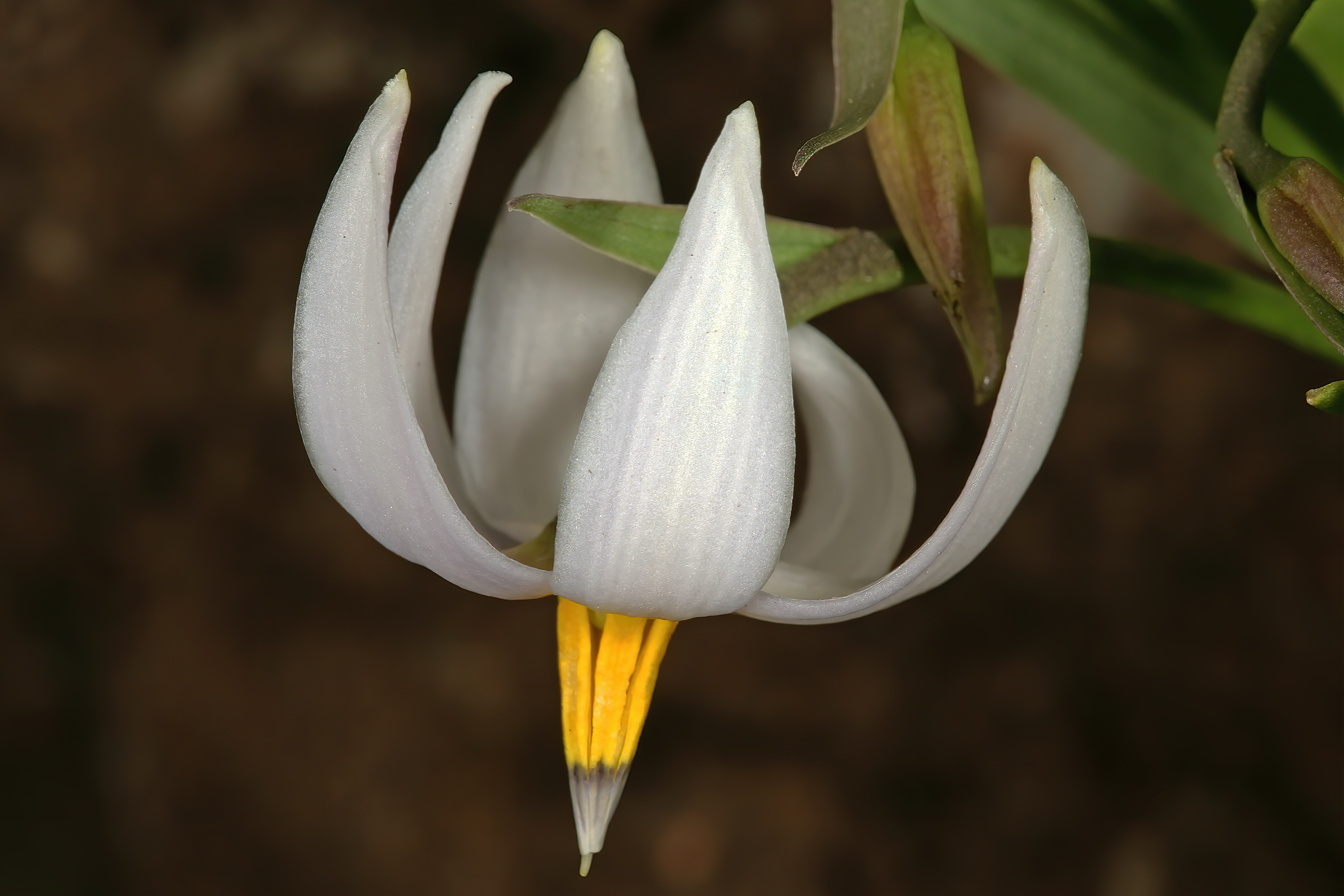

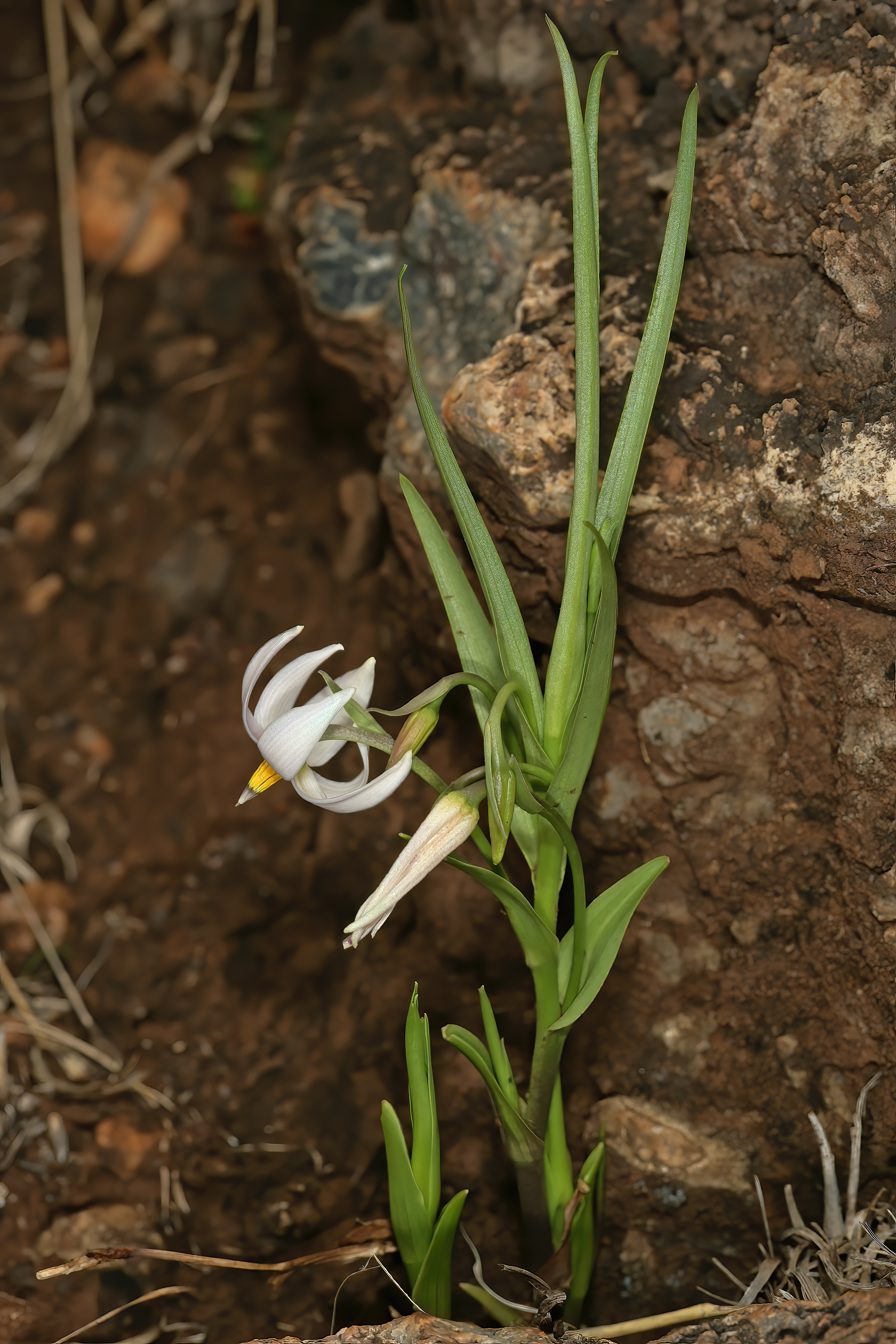

Scientific classification
- Kingdom: Plantae
- Clade: Tracheophytes
- Clade: Angiosperms
- Clade: Monocots
- Order: Asparagales
- Family: Tecophilaeaceae
- Genus: Walleria
- Species: W. nutans

Binomial name
- Walleria nutans J.Kirk

Synonyms
- Walleria baumii Dammer; Walleria hockii De Wild.; Walleria mackenziei var. nutans (J.Kirk) Baker; Walleria muricata N.E.Br.

= Walleria nutans =

Species of flowering plant

Walleria nutans is a perennial flowering plant belonging to the genus Walleria. The species is native to Angola, Botswana, Malawi, Mozambique, South Africa and Zambia.
