= Marie Maxime Cornu =

French botanist and mycologist (1843–1901)

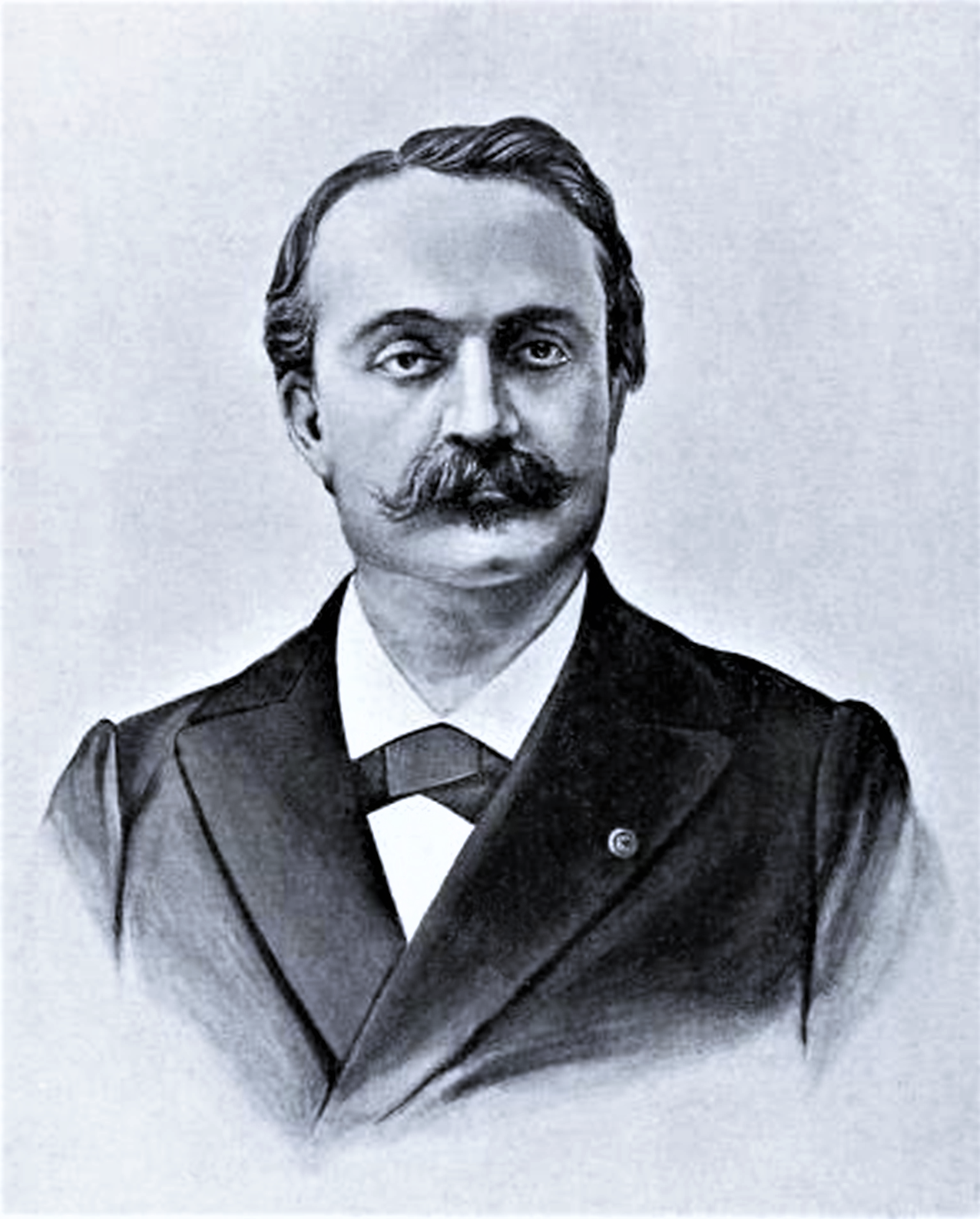
Maxime Cornue

Marie Maxime Cornu (July 16, 1843, in Orléans – April 3, 1901 in Paris) was a French botanist and mycologist. He was a younger brother of physicist Alfred Cornu (1841–1902).

He studied at the École normale supérieure, and in 1872 received his doctorate in natural sciences. He served as aide-naturaliste at Museum National d'Histoire Naturelle in Paris, where from 1876 he worked as a lecturer of botany. From 1883 to 1901 he was chair of horticulture at the museum. In 1897 he was named president of the Société botanique de France.

He is remembered for his research of cryptogams, as well as his investigations involving agents of plant diseases, in particular Phylloxera vastatrix, a pest that caused extensive damage to French vineyards and negatively affected wine production. In 1896 he circumscribed the botanical genus Schoenlandia (family Tecophilaeaceae).

He is buried in the Pere Lachaise cemetery (Division 20), in Paris.

== Selected publications ==
- Monographie des Saprolégniées 1872 – Monograph on Saprolegniaceae.
- Études sur la nouvelle maladie de la vigne, 1875 – Studies on a new disease of the vine.
- Études sur le phylloxera vastatrix, 1878 – Studies on Phylloxera vastatrix.

== See also ==
- List of Chairs of the Muséum national d'histoire naturelle
