= Cyanella cygnea =

Scientific classification
- Kingdom: Plantae
- Clade: Tracheophytes
- Clade: Angiosperms
- Clade: Monocots
- Order: Asparagales
- Family: Tecophilaeaceae
- Genus: Cyanella
- Species: C. cygnea

Binomial name
- Cyanella cygnea G.Scott

Species of flowering plant

Cyanella cygnea is a perennial flowering plant and geophyte that belongs to the genus Cyanella and is part of the Renosterveld. The plant is endemic to the Northern Cape and occurs from the Richtersveld to Komaggas where it has an area of occurrence of 4,775 km^{2}. The habitat is threatened by overgrazing.
