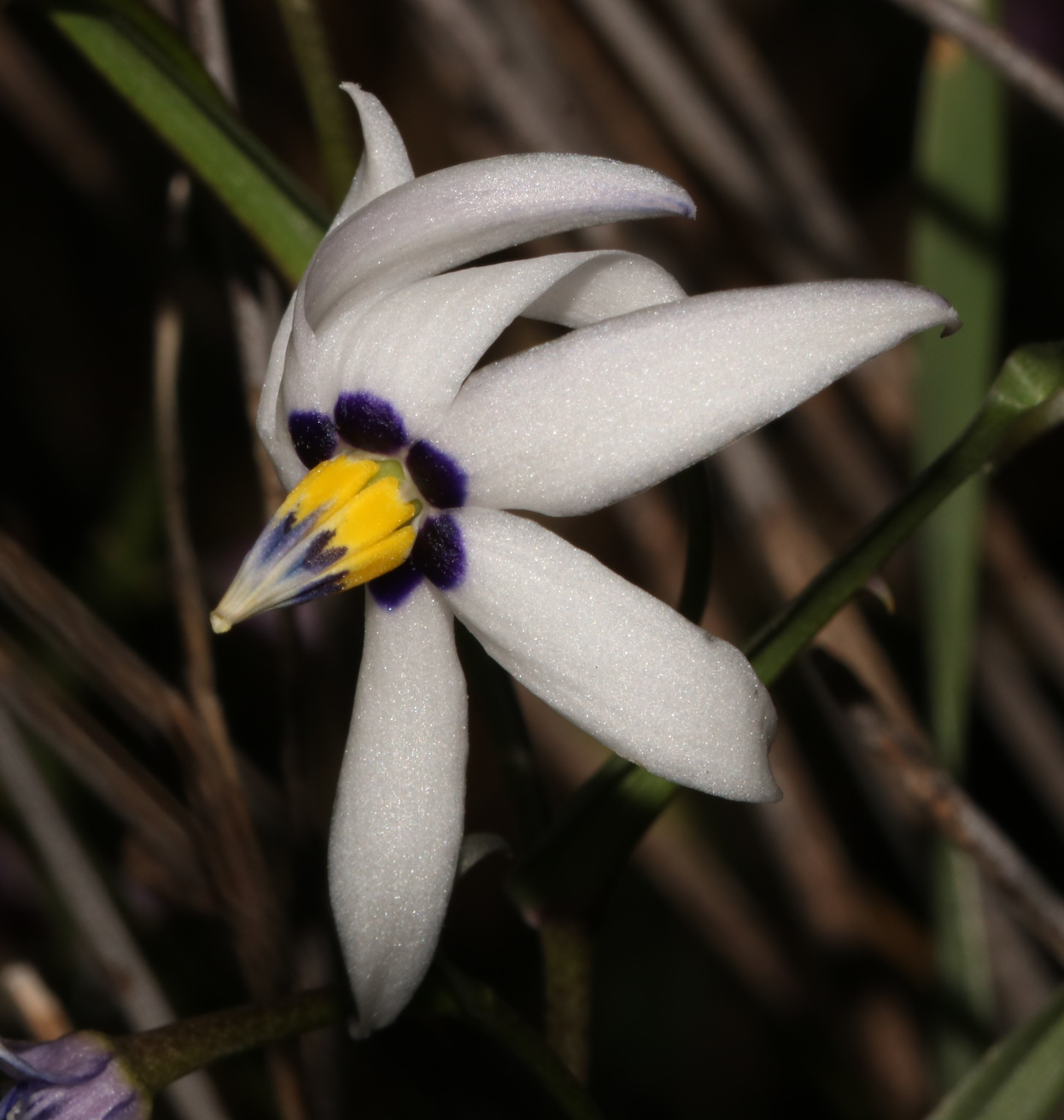
- Walleria gracilis

Scientific classification
- Kingdom: Plantae
- Clade: Tracheophytes
- Clade: Angiosperms
- Clade: Monocots
- Order: Asparagales
- Family: Tecophilaeaceae
- Genus: Walleria; J.Kirk

Synonyms
- Androsyne Salisb.

= Walleria =

Genus of flowering plants

Walleria is a genus of plants in the Tecophilaeaceae, first described as a genus in 1864. It is native to central and southern Africa.

Species

Image	Scientific name	Distribution
	Walleria gracilis (Salisb.) S.Carter	Namibia, Cape Province
	Walleria mackenziei J.Kirk	Zaire, Tanzania, Angola, Zambia, Malawi, Mozambique
	Walleria nutans J.Kirk	Angola, Zimbabwe, Botswana, Namibia, South Africa
