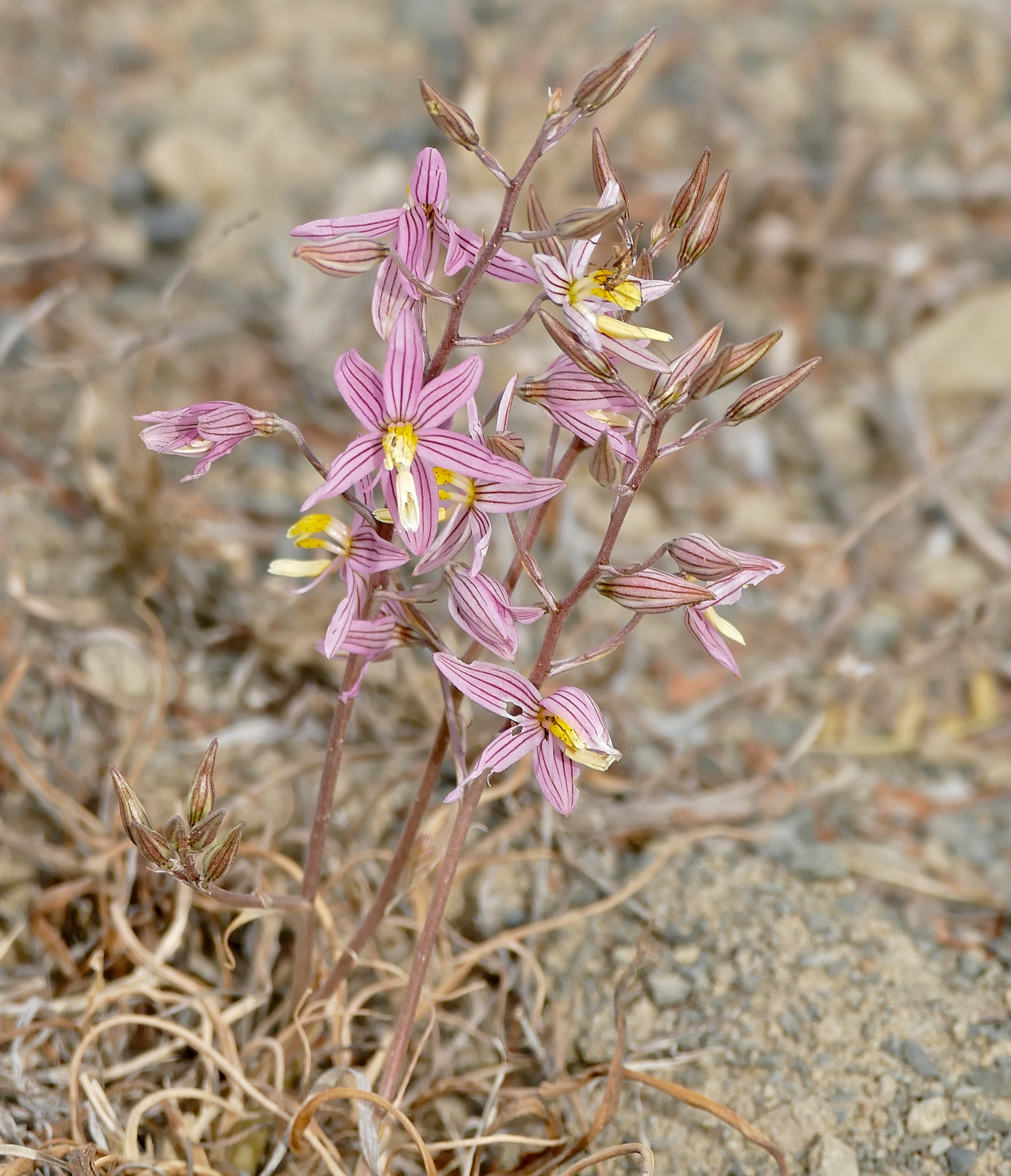
- Cyanella lutea

Scientific classification
- Kingdom: Plantae
- Clade: Tracheophytes
- Clade: Angiosperms
- Clade: Monocots
- Order: Asparagales
- Family: Tecophilaeaceae
- Genus: Cyanella; L.

Synonyms
- Pharetrella Salisb.; Trigella Salisb.

= Cyanella =

Genus of flowering plants

Cyanella is a genus of cormous perennial herbs native to South Africa and Namibia, first described for modern science in 1754.

== Species ==
As of October 2021, the World Checklist of Selected Plant Families accepted nine species:

- Cyanella alba L.f. - Cape Province
- Cyanella aquatica Oberm. ex G.Scott - Calvinia Division of Cape Province
- Cyanella cygnea G.Scott - Cape Province
- Cyanella hyacinthoides Royen ex L. - Cape Province; naturalized in Western Australia
- Cyanella lutea L.f. - Namibia, Cape Province, Free State
- Cyanella marlothii J.C.Manning & Goldblatt – Northern Cape Provinces
- Cyanella orchidiformis Jacq. - Cape Province
- Cyanella pentheri Zahlbr. – Cape Province
- Cyanella ramosissima (Engl. & Krause) Engl. & K.Krause - Namibia, Cape Province

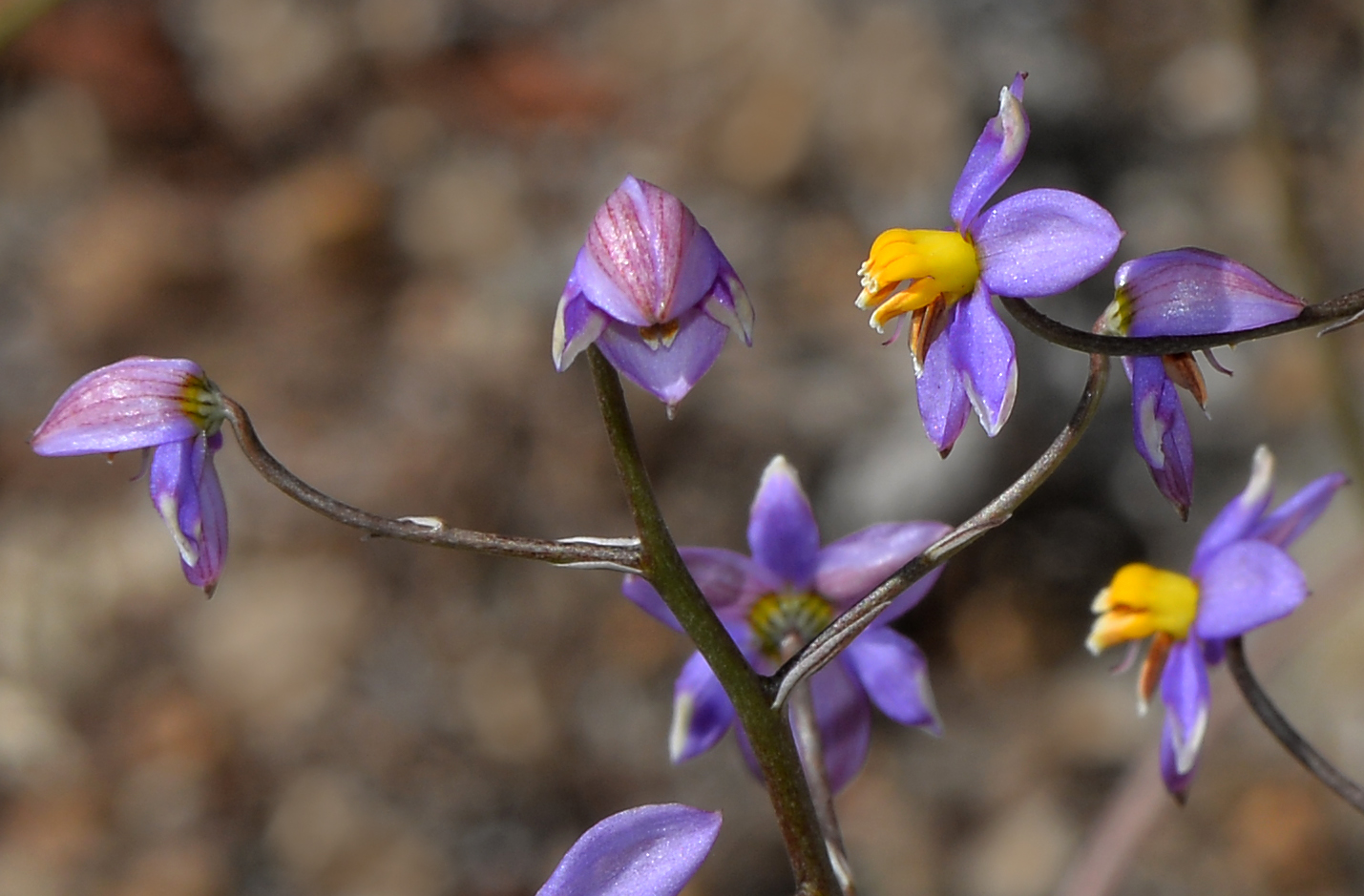
Flowers of Cyanella hyacinthoides
