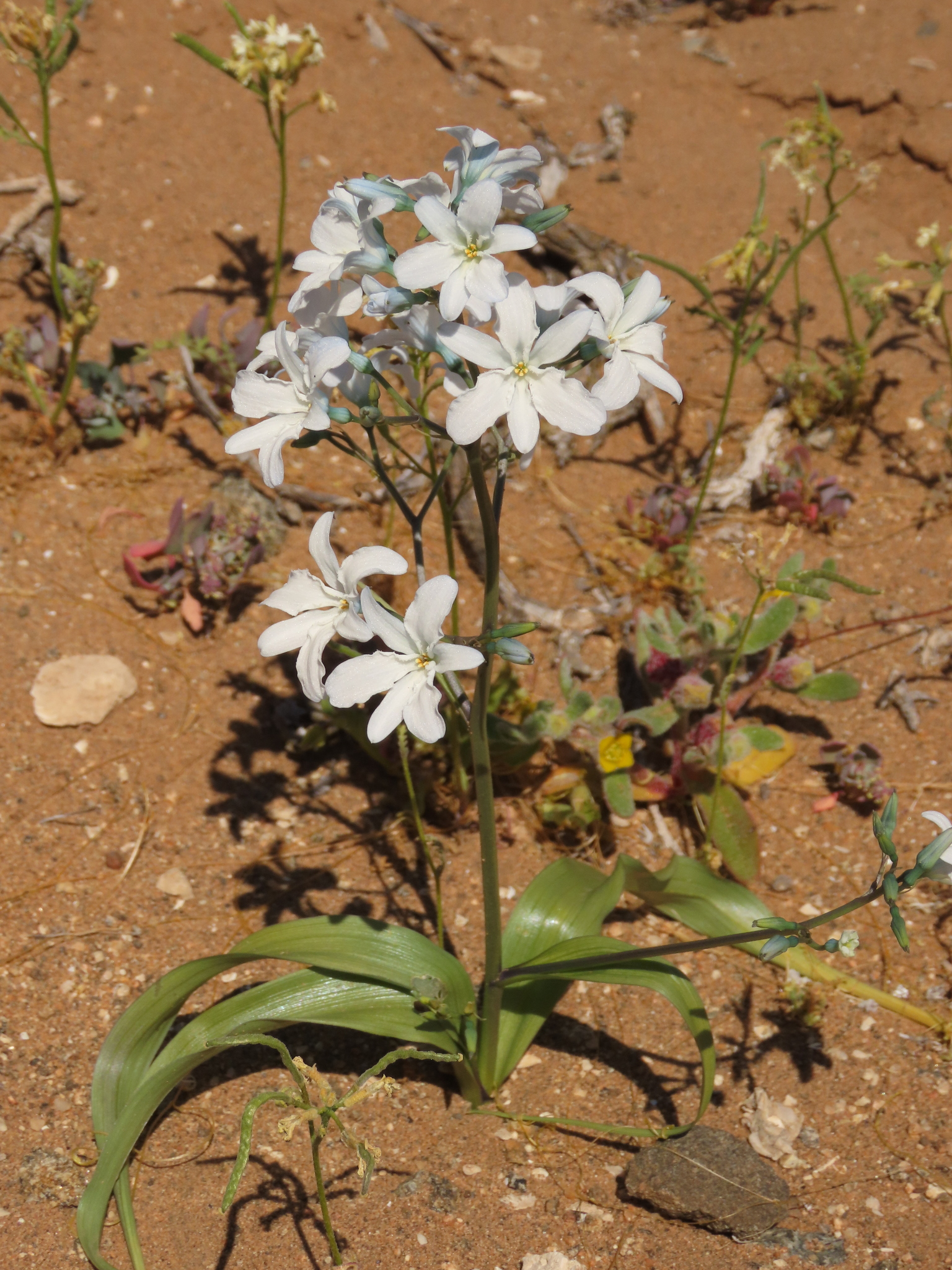
- Zephyra elegans

Scientific classification
- Kingdom: Plantae
- Clade: Tracheophytes
- Clade: Angiosperms
- Clade: Monocots
- Order: Asparagales
- Family: Tecophilaeaceae
- Genus: Zephyra; D.Don

Synonyms
- Dicolus Phil.

= Zephyra =

Species of plant

Zephyra is a genus of cormous plants in the Tecophilaeaceae, first described as a genus in 1832. It is endemic to Northern Chile in South America.

Species

Image	Scientific name	Distribution
	Zephyra compacta C.Ehrh.	Atacama, Coquimbo
	Zephyra elegans D.Don	Coquimbo
