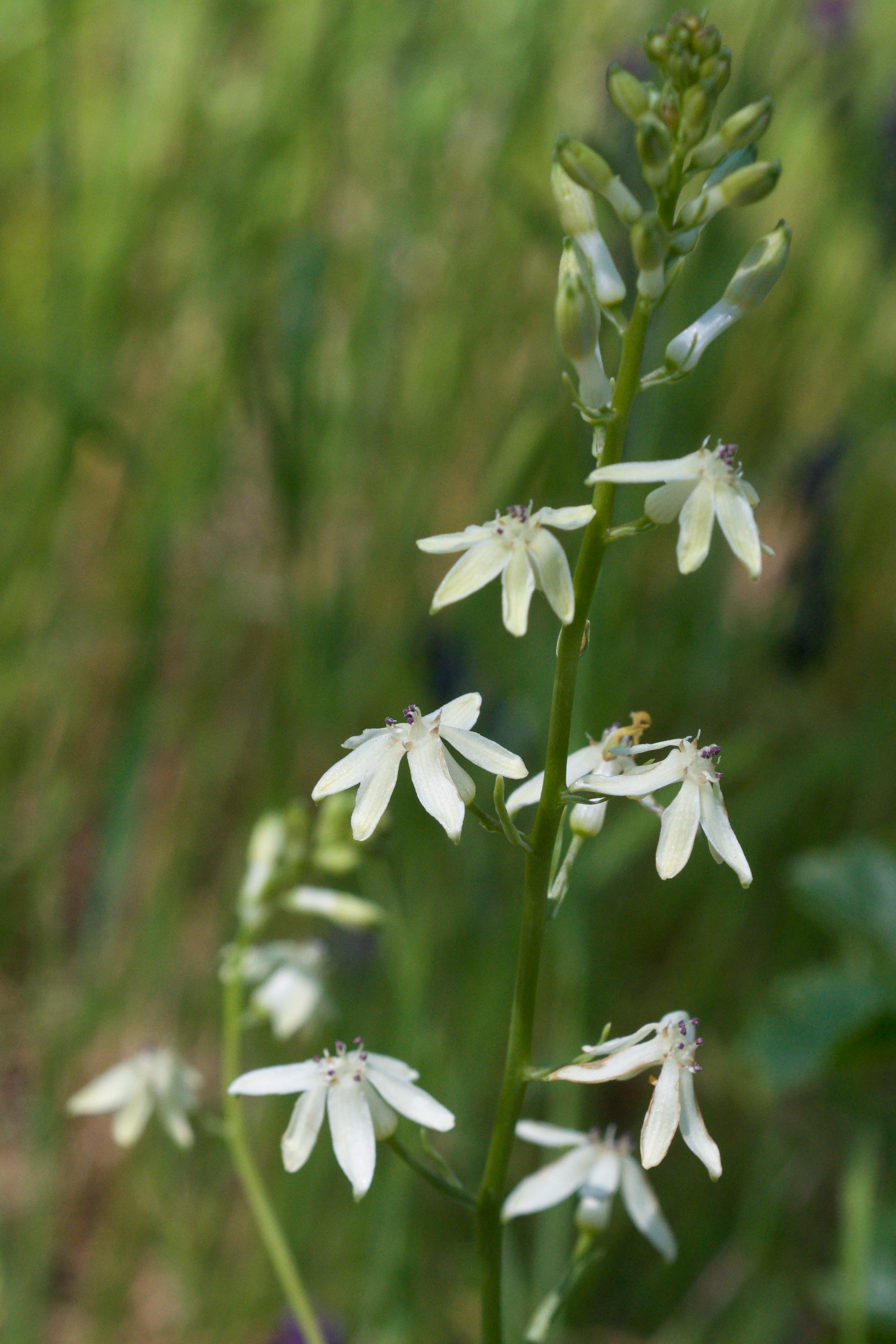

Scientific classification
- Kingdom: Plantae
- Clade: Tracheophytes
- Clade: Angiosperms
- Clade: Monocots
- Order: Asparagales
- Family: Tecophilaeaceae
- Genus: Odontostomum; Torr.
- Species: O. hartwegii

Binomial name
- Odontostomum hartwegii Torr.

= Odontostomum =

Genus of flowering plants

Odontostomum is a monotypic genus of flowering plants containing the single species Odontostomum hartwegii, which is known by the common name Hartweg's doll's-lily. In the APG III classification system, it is placed in the family Tecophilaeaceae. It was formerly placed in the Liliaceae. It This wildflower is endemic to northern California, where it can be found in the inner coastal mountain ranges and the Sierra Nevada foothills. It grows in rocky clay and often serpentine soils in grassland and woodland habitat, sometimes near vernal pools. This is a perennial herb growing from an oval-shaped corm up to 3 centimeters wide deep in the soil. The curving, widely branching stem is up to about half a meter in maximum height with linear leaves up to 30 centimeters long sheathing the lower portion. The inflorescence is a raceme or panicle of several flowers on pedicels. Each flower has six white or yellowish tepals, the lower parts fused into a veined tube and the tips spreading and then becoming reflexed. At the center of the flower are six stamens and six staminodes in a ring around the gynoecium.
