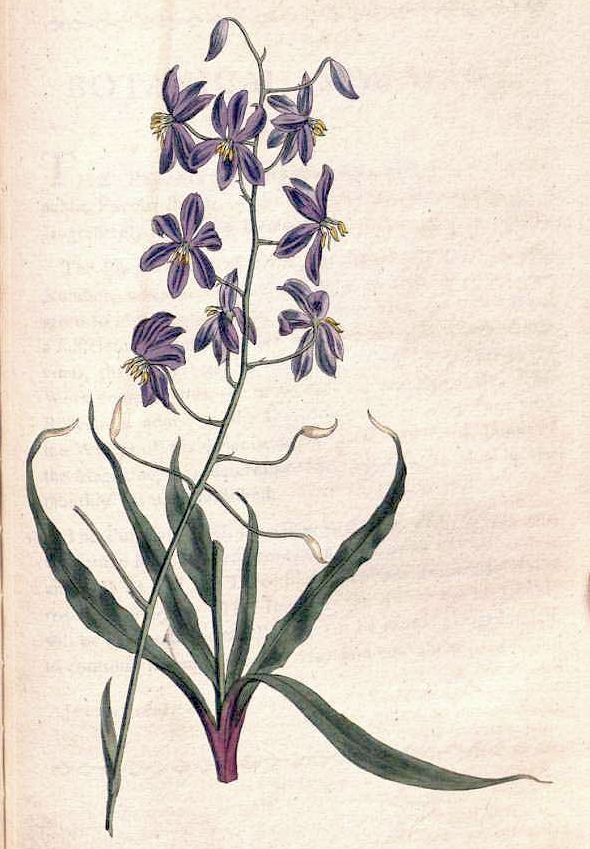

Scientific classification
- Kingdom: Plantae
- Clade: Tracheophytes
- Clade: Angiosperms
- Clade: Monocots
- Order: Asparagales
- Family: Tecophilaeaceae
- Genus: Cyanella
- Species: C. hyacinthoides

Binomial name
- Cyanella hyacinthoides Royen ex L.

Synonyms
- Cyanella pentheri Zahlbr.

= Cyanella hyacinthoides =

Lady's hand

Species of flowering plant

Cyanella hyacinthoides ("lady's hand" or "Raaptoluintjie") is a species of cormous annual or perennial herb native to the western parts of South Africa.

== Description ==
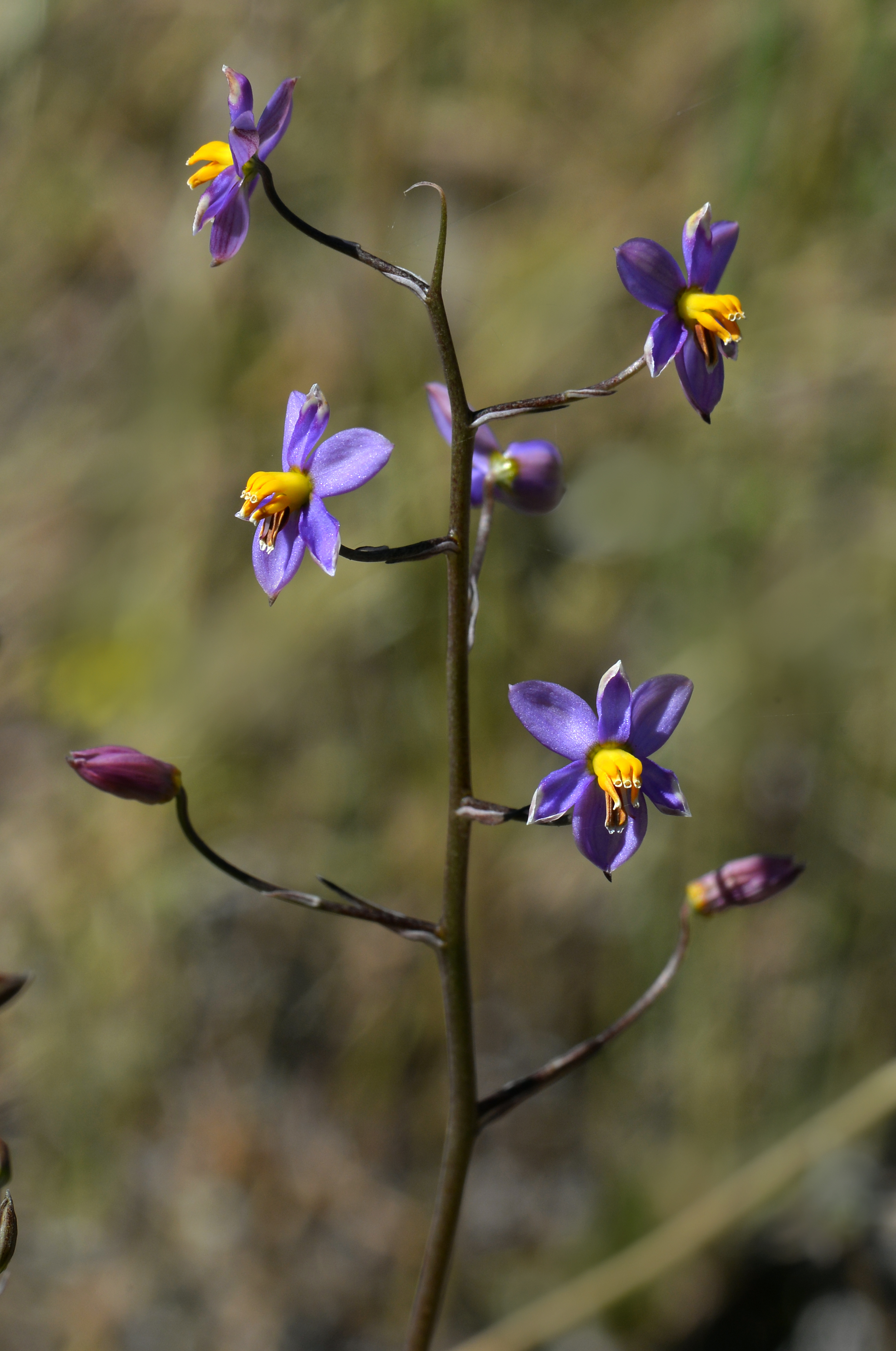
Detail of the flower of Cyanella hyacinthoides

It has a basal rosette, with slender, lanceolate, crisped (wavy-margins) leaves.

The mauve, pink, purple or blue (rarely white) flowers are mildly scented, and appear on a spreading inflorescence in Spring (August to November in the southern hemisphere). The plant can be up to 40 centimetres high.

== Distribution and habitat ==
It is native to the Cape region of South Africa, especially the renosterveld, where it usually grows in loamy soil in clay and granite slopes. Its range extends as far north as the Namaqualand, and southwards into the Overberg region of the southern Cape, as far as the town of Riversdale.

It is also reportedly naturalised in Western Australia.

The bulb is edible once cooked, and is said to serve as an onion substitute.

It tolerates drought but is vulnerable to frost.
