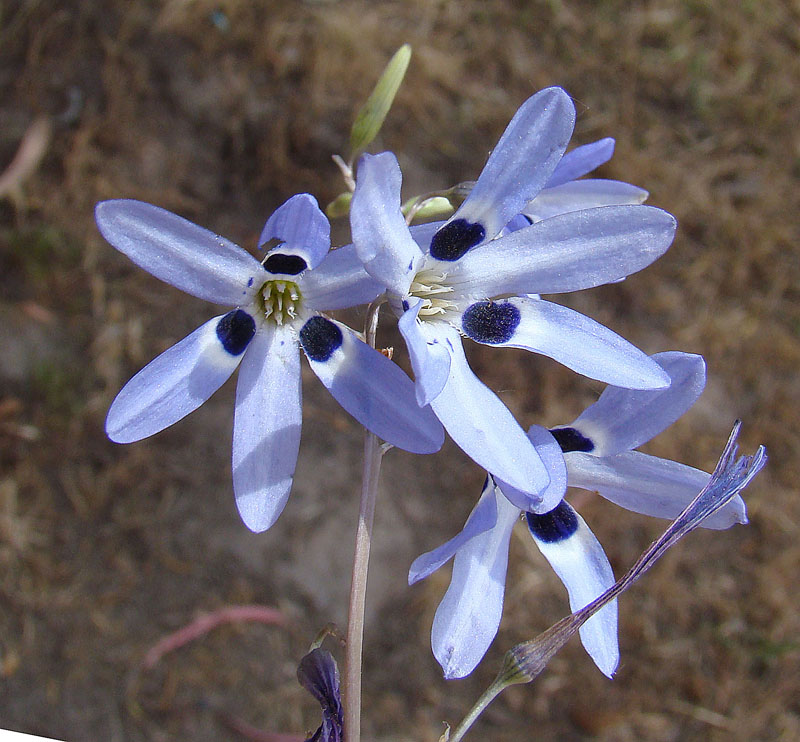
- Conanthera campanulata

Scientific classification
- Kingdom: Plantae
- Clade: Tracheophytes
- Clade: Angiosperms
- Clade: Monocots
- Order: Asparagales
- Family: Tecophilaeaceae
- Genus: Conanthera; Ruiz & Pav.

Type species
- Conanthera bifolia Ruiz & Pav.

Synonyms
- Cummingia D.Don

= Conanthera =

Genus of flowering plants

Conanthera is a genus of small bulbous plants with small panicles of blue, purple or white and purple flowers. Propagation is by offsets or seed. All species are native to Chile, but there is an old 18th-Century report of C. bifolia occurring in colonial Peru as well. This could possibly be attributed to changes in boundaries between the two countries, as modern sources list the species as endemic to Chile.

Species

1. Conanthera bifolia Ruiz & Pav. - from Valparaíso to La Araucanía
2. Conanthera campanulata Lindl. - from Antofagasta to La Araucanía
3. Conanthera parvula (Phil.) Muñoz-Schick - from Valparaíso to La Araucanía
4. Conanthera trimaculata (D.Don) F.Meigen - central Chile
5. Conanthera urceolata Ravenna - Atacama
