= Psammobates =

- Geometric tortoise (Psammobates geometricus)

Scientific classification
- Kingdom: Animalia
- Phylum: Chordata
- Class: Reptilia
- Order: Testudines
- Suborder: Cryptodira
- Family: Testudinidae
- Genus: Psammobates; Fitzinger, 1835
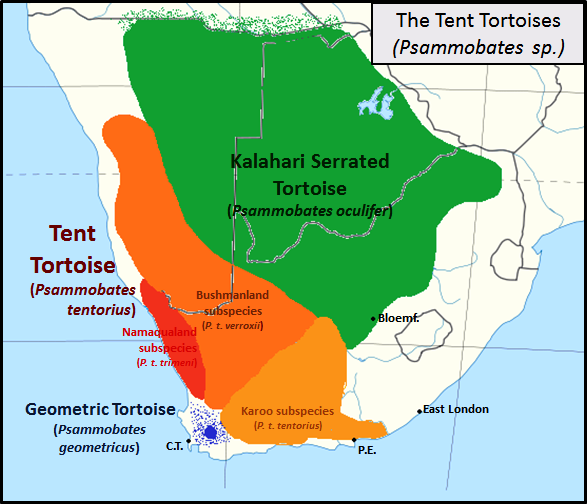

Genus of tortoises

Psammobates is a genus of tortoise erected by Leopold Fitzinger in 1835. This genus contains three species, all of which are indigenous to southern Africa.

The genus name means "sand-loving", and these tortoises typically inhabit the arid and semi-arid areas of southern Africa. Their diets and adaptations for this environment mean that these species do not generally survive outside their habitats and soon die when kept in captivity.

All three species suffer from illegal collecting and habitat destruction, but the geometric tortoise has historically been the worst affected and is now endangered.

== Species ==
- Geometric tortoise, Psammobates geometricus
- Serrated tortoise, Psammobates oculifer
- Tent tortoise, Psammobates tentorius
  - Karoo subspecies, Psammobates tentorius tentorius (type species)
  - Namaqualand subspecies, Psammobates tentorius trimeni
  - Bushmanland subspecies, Psammobates tentorius verroxii
