= Eremiolirion =

Scientific classification
- Kingdom: Plantae
- Clade: Tracheophytes
- Clade: Angiosperms
- Clade: Monocots
- Order: Asparagales
- Family: Tecophilaeaceae
- Genus: Eremiolirion; J.C.Manning & F.Forest
- Species: E. amboense

Binomial name
- Eremiolirion amboense (Schinz) J.C.Manning & Mannh.

Synonyms
- Cyanella amboensis Schinz

Genus of flowering plants

Eremiolirion is a plant genus in the family Tecophilaeaceae, first described as a genus in 2005.

It has one known species, Eremiolirion amboense, native to Angola and Namibia.
