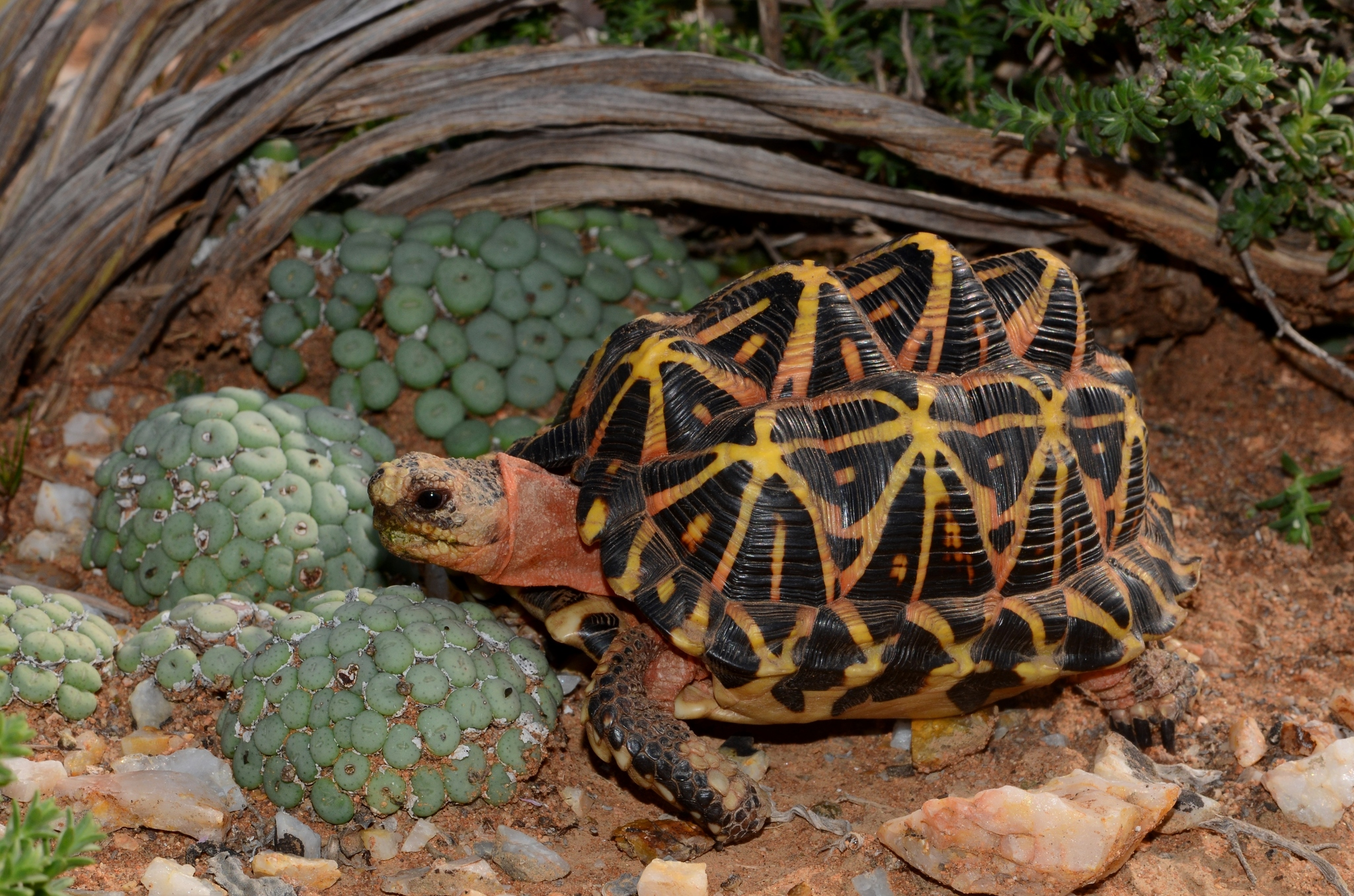
- Western 'Namaqualand' tent tortoise (P. t. trimeni)
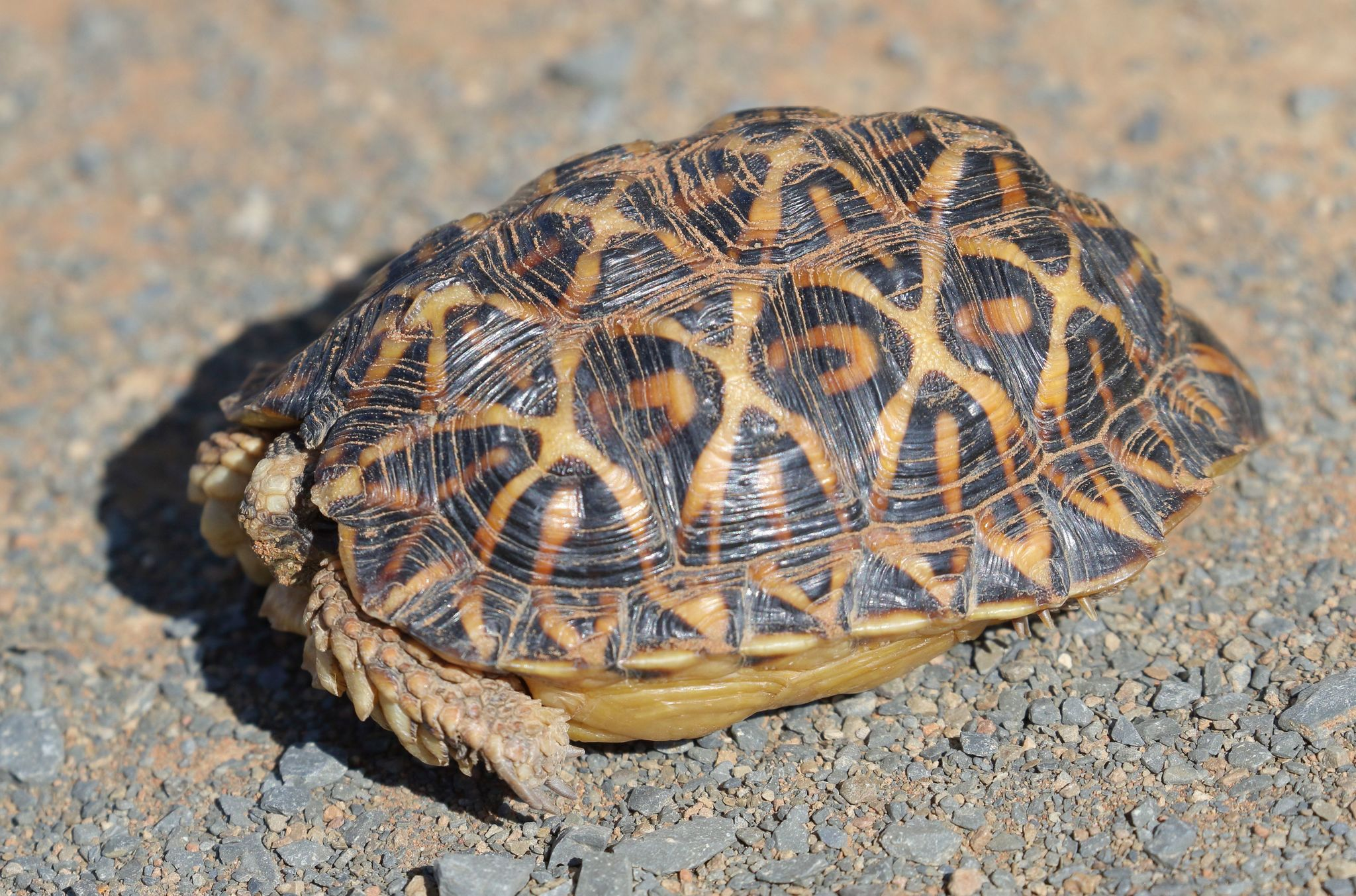
- Northern tent tortoise (P. t. verroxii)

Conservation status
- Near Threatened (IUCN 3.1)

Scientific classification
- Kingdom: Animalia
- Phylum: Chordata
- Class: Reptilia
- Order: Testudines
- Suborder: Cryptodira
- Family: Testudinidae
- Genus: Psammobates
- Species: P. tentorius

Binomial name
- Psammobates tentorius (Kuhl, 1820)
- IUCN distribution of the Karoo tent tortoise Karoo tent tortoise Western 'Namaqualand' tent tortoise

Synonyms
- P. t. tentorius: Testudo tentoria Bell, 1828; Peltastes tentorius Gray, 1870; Chersinella tentoria albanica Hewitt, 1933; Chersinella tentoria duerdeni Hewitt, 1933; Chersinella tentoria karuella Hewitt, 1933; Chersinella tentoria karuica Hewitt, 1933; Chersinella tentoria lativittata Hewitt, 1933; Chersinella tentoria piscatella Hewitt, 1933; Chersinella tentoria subsulcata Hewitt, 1933; Chersinella tentoria tentorioides Hewitt, 1933; Psammobates tentoria albanica Hewitt, 1937; Psammobates tentoria duerdeni Hewitt, 1937; Psammobates tentoria piscatella Hewitt, 1937; Psammobates [tentoria] tentoria Hewitt, 1937; Psammobates tentoria tentorioides Hewitt, 1937; Psammobates tentoria karruica FitzSimons, 1946 (ex errore); Psammobates tentorius tentorius Loveridge & Williams, 1957; Testudo tentoria tentoria Wermuth & Mertens, 1961; P. t. trimeni: Testudo trimeni Boulenger, 1886; Chersinella tentoria hexensis Hewitt, 1933; Chersinella trimeni Hewitt, 1933; Psammobates trimeni Hewitt, 1937; Psammobates tentorius trimeni Loveridge & Williams, 1957; Testudo tentoria trimeni Wermuth & Mertens, 1961; Psammobates tentoria trimeni Obst, 1985; P. t. verroxii: Testudo verroxii Smith, 1839; Peltastes verreauxii Gray, 1870; Peltastes verroxii Gray, 1870; Testudo verreauxii Rochebrune, 1884; Testudo fiski Boulenger, 1886; Testudo smithi Boulenger, 1886; Testudo fiskii Boulenger, 1889 (ex errore); Testudo smithii Boulenger, 1889 (ex errore); Testudo seimundi Boulenger, 1903; Testudo boettgeri Siebenrock, 1904; Homopus bergeri Lindholm, 1906; Testudo bergeri Siebenrock, 1909; Testudo oscarboettgeri Lindholm, 1929; Chersinella fiski colesbergensis Hewitt, 1934; Chersinella fiski cronwrighti Hewitt, 1934; Chersinella [fiski] fiski Hewitt, 1934; Chersinella fiski grica Hewitt, 1934; Chersinella fiski gricoides Hewitt, 1934; Chersinella fiski orangensis Hewitt, 1934; Chersinella fiski seimundi Hewitt, 1934; Chersinella schonlandi Hewitt, 1934; Chersinella verroxii amasensis Hewitt, 1934; Chersinella verroxii bergeri Hewitt, 1934; Chersinella verroxii boettgeri Hewitt, 1934; Chersinella verroxii smithi Hewitt, 1934; Chersinella [verroxii] verroxii Hewitt, 1934; Testudo verroxi Mertens, Müller & Rust, 1934 (ex errore); Chersinella boettgeri FitzSimons, 1935; Chersinella fiskii FitzSimons, 1935; Psammobates fiski colesbergensis Hewitt, 1937; Psammobates fiski cronwrighti Hewitt, 1937; Psammobates depressa FitzSimons, 1938; Psammobates fiskii FitzSimons, 1938; Psammobates fiskii fiskii FitzSimons, 1946; Testudo smithi bergeri Mertens & Wermuth, 1955; Testudo smithi smithi Mertens & Wermuth, 1955; Testudo verroxii bergeri Mertens, 1955; Testudo verroxii smithi Mertens, 1955; Psammobates tentorius verroxii Loveridge & Williams, 1957; Chersinella schoenlandi Villiers, 1958 (ex errore); Psammobates verrauxi Villiers, 1958 (ex errore); Testudo tentoria verroxii Wermuth & Mertens, 1961; Psammobates tentorius verroxi Pritchard, 1979; Psammobates tentoria verroxi Obst, 1985; Testudo tentorius verroxii Branch, 1989; Psammobates tentorius veroxi Highfield, 1996 (ex errore)

= Tent tortoise =

Species of tortoise

The tent tortoise (Psammobates tentorius) is a species of tortoise and one of three members of the genus, Psammobates. Known locally as the Karoo tent tortoise, this highly variable species is found in South Africa and Namibia.

== Distribution ==
The Karoo tent tortoise occurs at very low densities throughout the Karoo and other semi-desert areas of southern Africa, extending from central Namibia almost to the southern coast of South Africa.

Within this range, its population is very sparse and individuals are normally rare and widely separated. The species is also increasingly rare due to habitat destruction and illegal collecting for the pet trade. Due to its specific diet that consists of certain Karoo plants, this species rarely survives in captivity and usually soon dies when taken outside of its natural habitat.

== Identification ==
The Karoo tent tortoise is a very variable species, with at least three subspecies. Its shell is dark brown or black with a pattern of yellow or orange striped stars radiating from the centre of each domed shield making up the carapace. The tent tortoise has a beautiful geometric pattern of 'Bedouin tents' on its upper shell, and this is appropriate, for it is quite at home in the semi-desert. The colouring and size of this little tortoise vary greatly, particularly from one area to another, but also within a single 'population'. Occasional specimens are a uniform brown, though this is very rare. Male specimens are much smaller than the females, and have concave bellies.

Although this species shares much of its superficial outer appearance with its relatives in the genus Psammobates, it can easily be distinguished by its un-serrated shell margins, and the scutes along its shell bridge, which are broader than they are high.

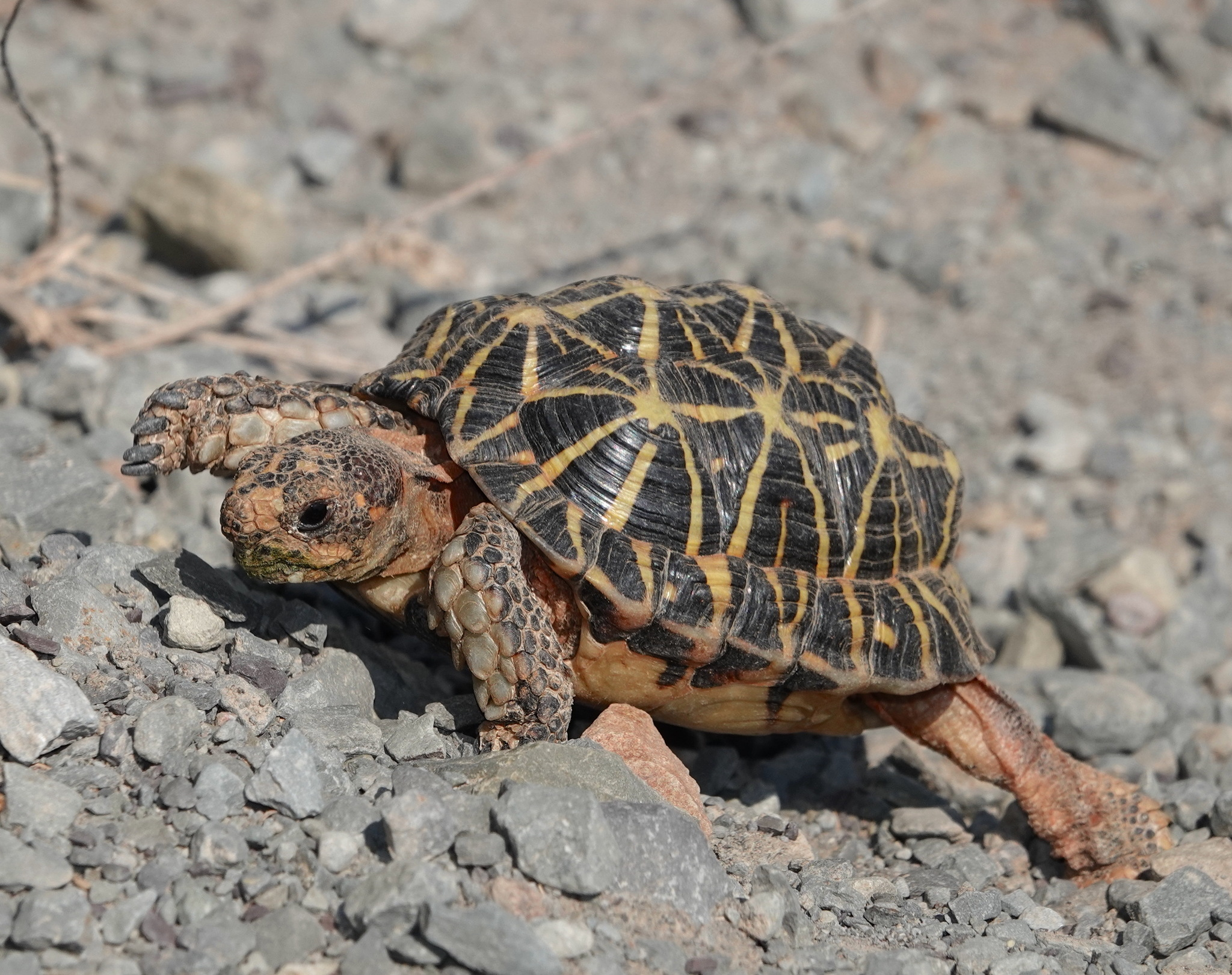
Southern 'Karoo' tent tortoise

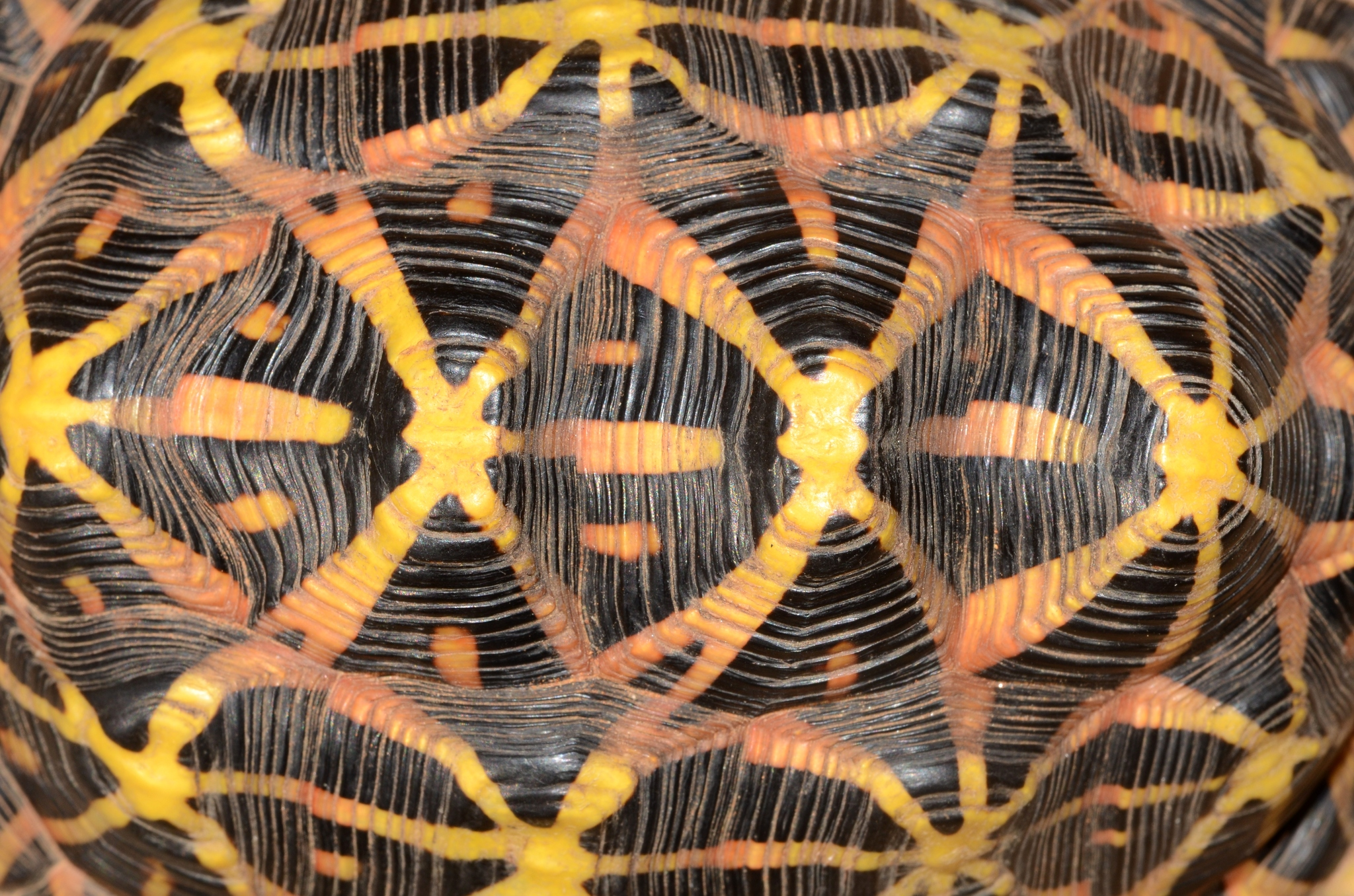
Western 'Namaqualand' tent tortoise scutes

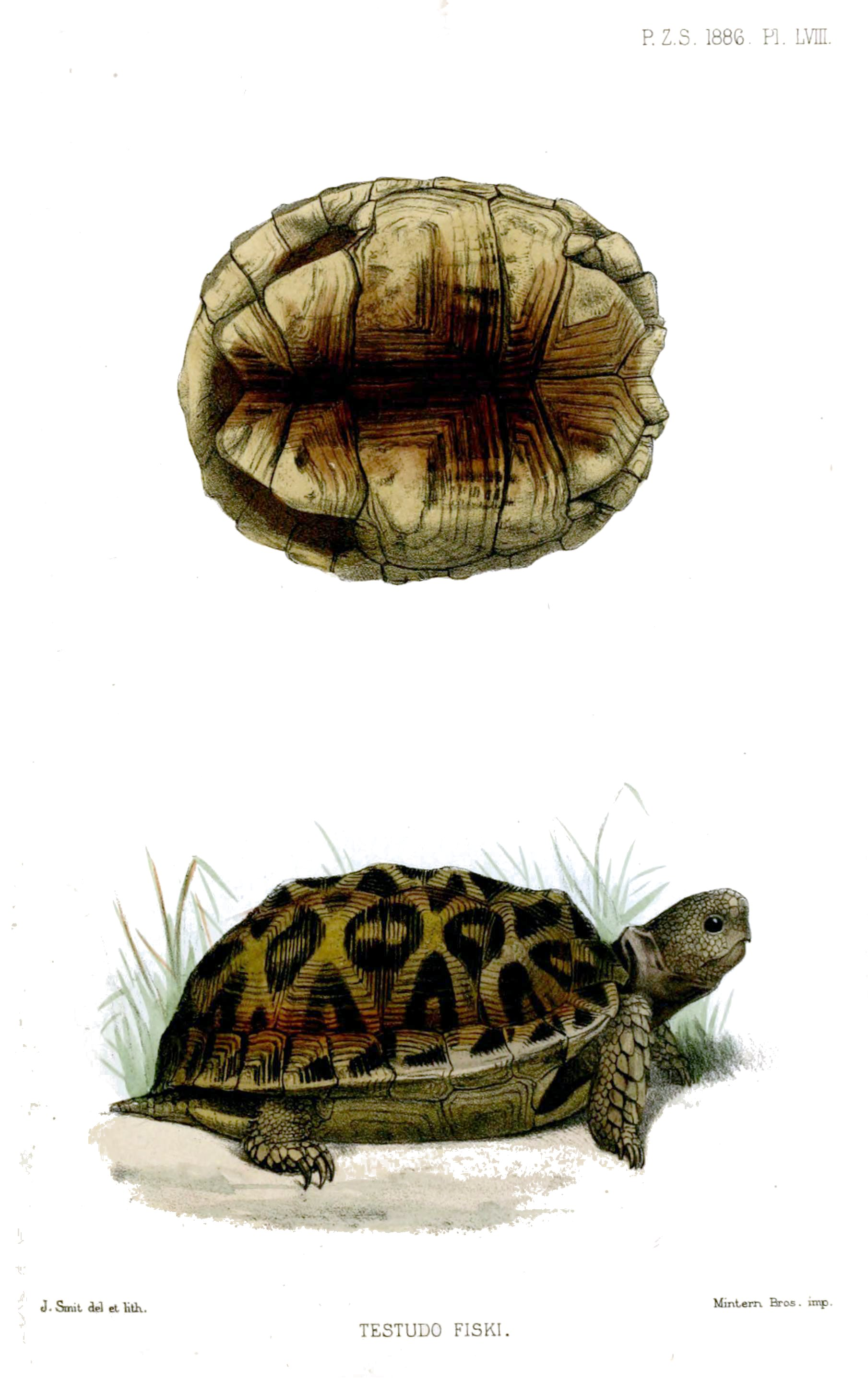
Northern tent tortoise

== Subspecies ==
Three subspecies are recognised by biologists:

- Southern ("Karoo") tent tortoise, Psammobates tentorius tentorius (type species) or common tent tortoise. Authority: Bell 1828. Distribution: The southern Karoo region. South Africa(Southern and eastern Karoo from Grahamstown to Matjiesfontein). This subspecies has the most sharply raised 'tents' (conical scutes), with dull yellow stars radiating on a black background.

Western tent tortoise
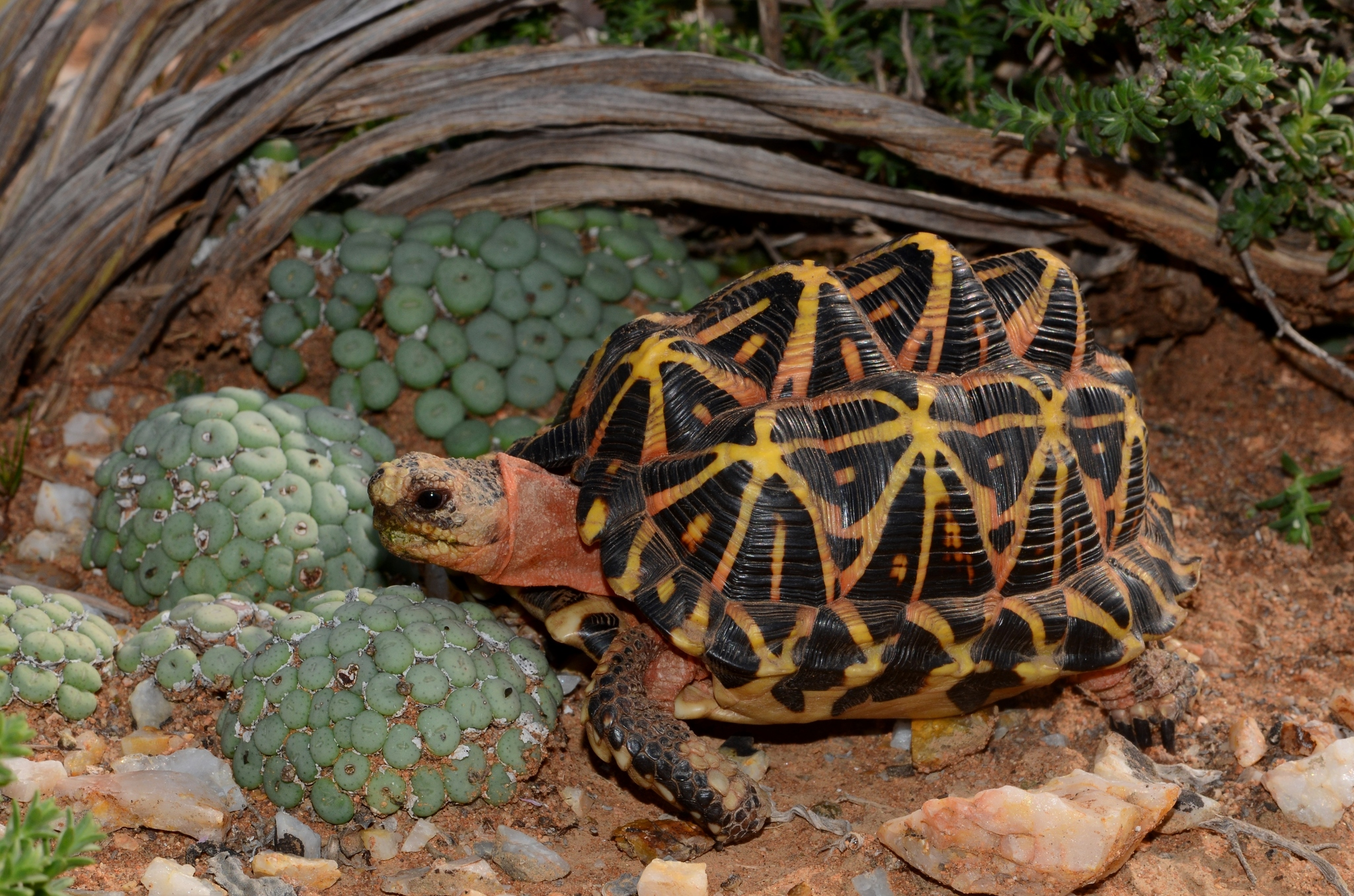

Conservation status
- Endangered (IUCN 3.1)

Scientific classification
- Kingdom: Animalia
- Phylum: Chordata
- Class: Reptilia
- Order: Testudines
- Suborder: Cryptodira
- Family: Testudinidae
- Genus: Psammobates
- Species: P. tentorius
- Subspecies: P. t. trimeni

Trinomial name
- Psammobates tentorius trimeni Boulenger, 1886

Western ("Namaqualand") tent tortoise, Psammobates tentorius trimeni. Authority: Boulenger, 1886. Distribution: The Namaqualand Coast of Namibia and South Africa (from Lambert's Bay north to beyond the Orange River in Great Namaqualand - extreme western Cape Provinces). This is the smallest subspecies, with the boldest, brightest colouring and well-developed 'tents' (conical shell scutes).

- Northern ("Bushmanland") tent tortoise, Psammobates tentorius verroxii. Authority: Smith, 1839. Distribution: The driest parts of the Karoo inland. Namibia (Northwest to the Great Namaqualand) and South Africa(Northern Cape Province). This subspecies has a flatter, rounder shell with underdeveloped 'tents', and more faded brown colouring.

== Behaviour ==
The female tent tortoise lays a clutch of one to three eggs, and buries them in the sand as all other tortoises do. The young emerge in late summer or early autumn.

== Diet ==
They depend on a very specialised diet including assorted Karoo bushes, mesembryanthemums and other South African succulents. Due to this diet, this little tortoise does not usually survive in captivity and usually dies soon, when taken outside of its semi-desert habitat.
