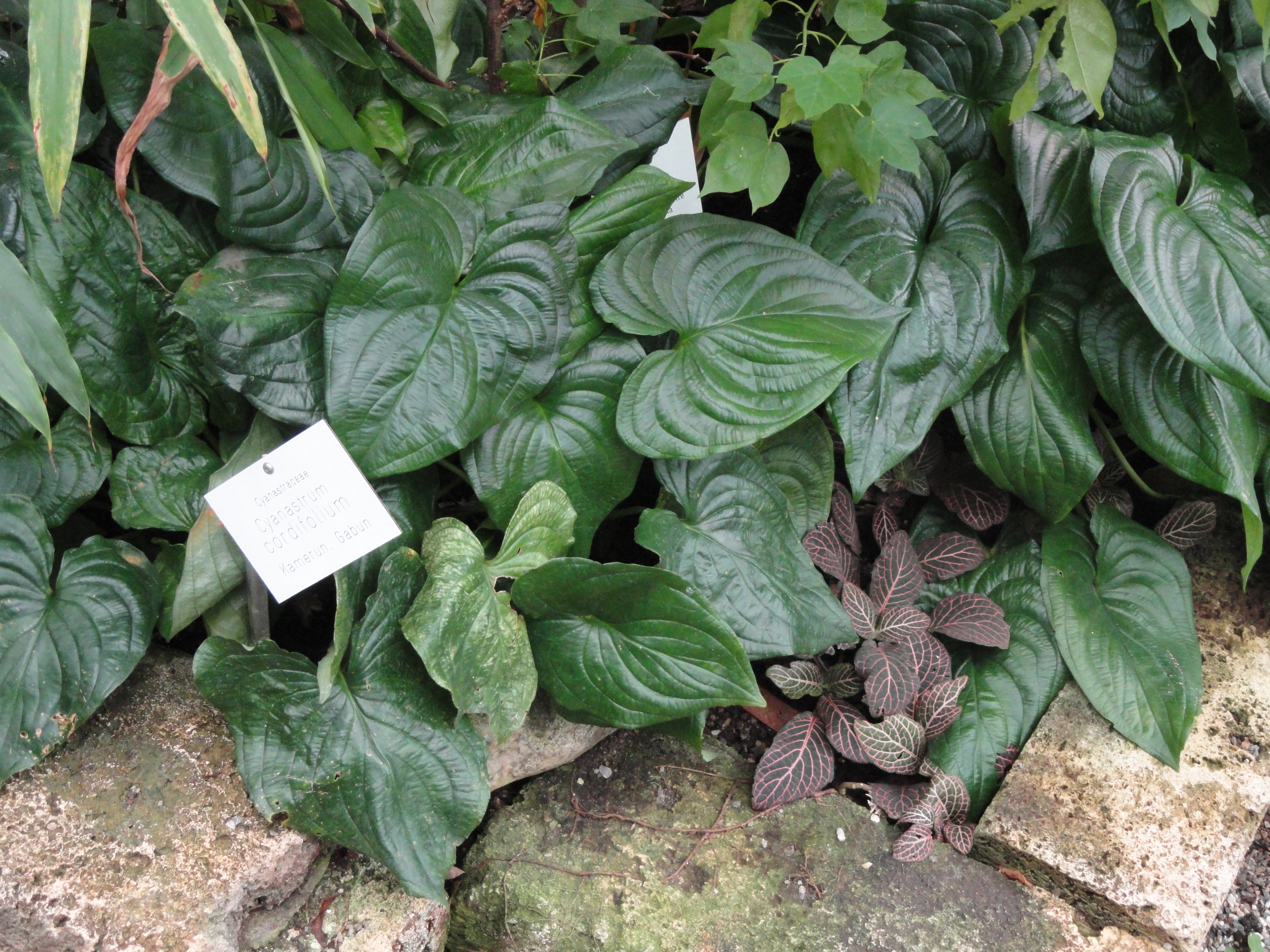
- Cyanastrum cordifolium

Scientific classification
- Kingdom: Plantae
- Clade: Tracheophytes
- Clade: Angiosperms
- Clade: Monocots
- Order: Asparagales
- Family: Tecophilaeaceae
- Genus: Cyanastrum; Oliv.

Type species
- Cyanastrum cordifolium

Synonyms
- Schoenlandia Cornu

= Cyanastrum =

Genus of flowering plants

Cyanastrum is a genus of plants in the family Tecophilaeaceae, native to tropical Africa. It contains three currently recognized species.

== Description ==
Cyanastrum has a corm that lacks a protective tunic. The leaf and the inflorescence emerge from different corm-scales, and are present at different times. The leaf has a short stalk, is basal and is usually single. The inflorescence is a raceme, often with no bracts, the tepals are blue and the flowers have parts in sixes.

== Species ==
The following species are recognized:

1. Cyanastrum cordifolium Oliv. – Nigeria, Cameroon, Equatorial Guinea, Gabon, Congo-Brazzaville, Zaire (Congo-Kinshasa)
2. Cyanastrum goetzeanum Engl. – Tanzania
3. Cyanastrum johnstonii Baker in D.Oliver & auct. suc. (eds.) – Tanzania, Zambia, Mozambique, Zaire (Congo-Kinshasa)
