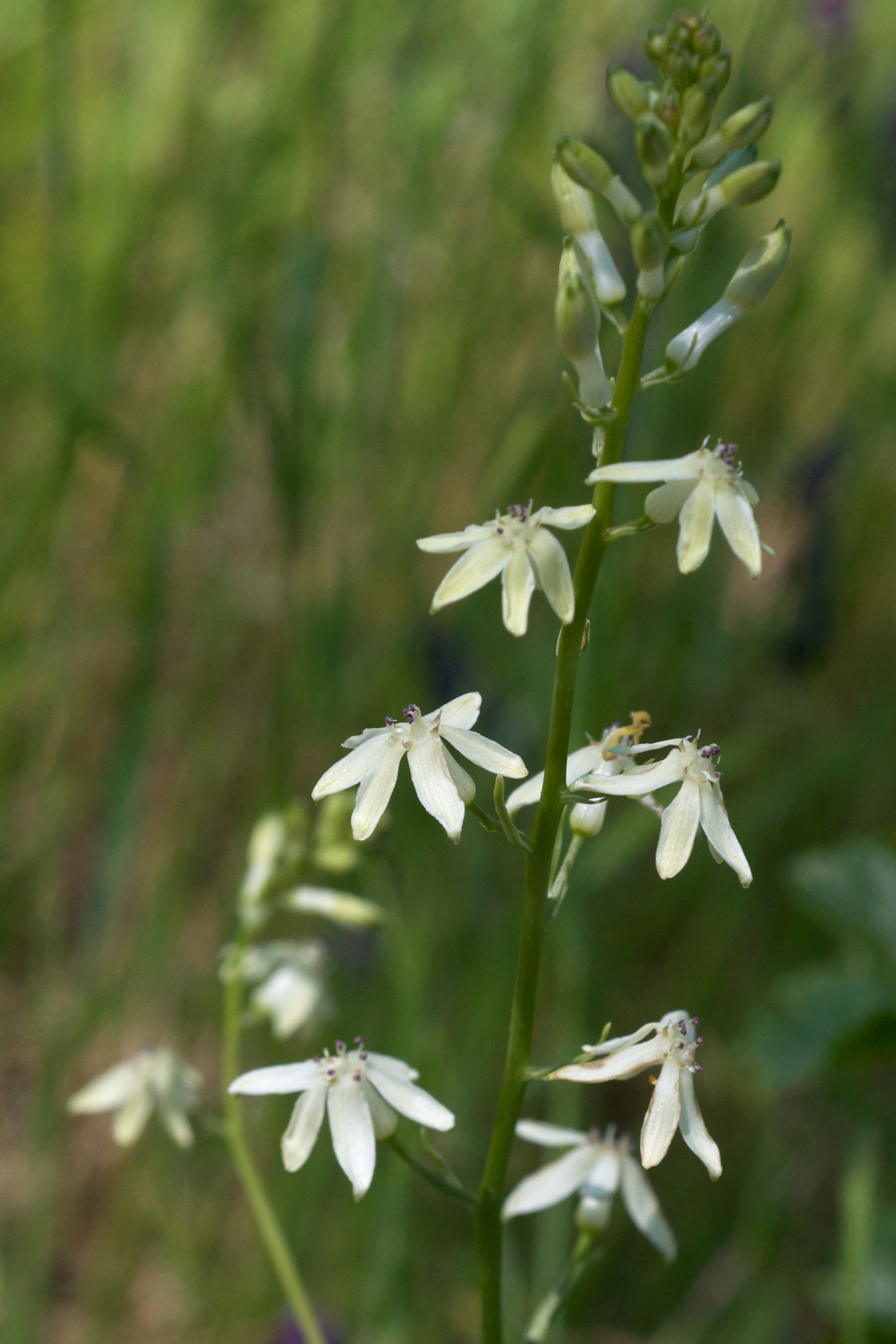
- Odontostomum hartwegii

Scientific classification
- Kingdom: Plantae
- Clade: Tracheophytes
- Clade: Angiosperms
- Clade: Monocots
- Order: Asparagales
- Family: Tecophilaeaceae; Leyb.

Genera
- See text

Synonyms
- Cyanastraceae

= Tecophilaeaceae =

Family of flowering plants

Tecophilaeaceae is a family of flowering plants, placed in the order Asparagales of the monocots. It consists of nine genera with a total of 27 species.

The family has only recently been recognized by taxonomists. The APG IV system of 2016 (unchanged from the 1998, 2003, and 2009 versions) does recognize this family. The family then includes over half a dozen genera, with only a few dozen species, occurring in Africa, in western South America and western North America. This circumscription includes the genus Cyanastrum, which sometimes has been treated as a separate family Cyanastraceae.

== Genera ==
The following genera are recognised:

- Conanthera Ruiz & Pav.
- Cyanastrum Oliv.
- Cyanella Royen
- Eremiolirion J.C.Manning & F.Forest
- Kabuyea Brummitt
- Odontostomum Torr.
- Tecophilaea Bertero ex Colla
- Walleria J.Kirk
- Zephyra D.Don
