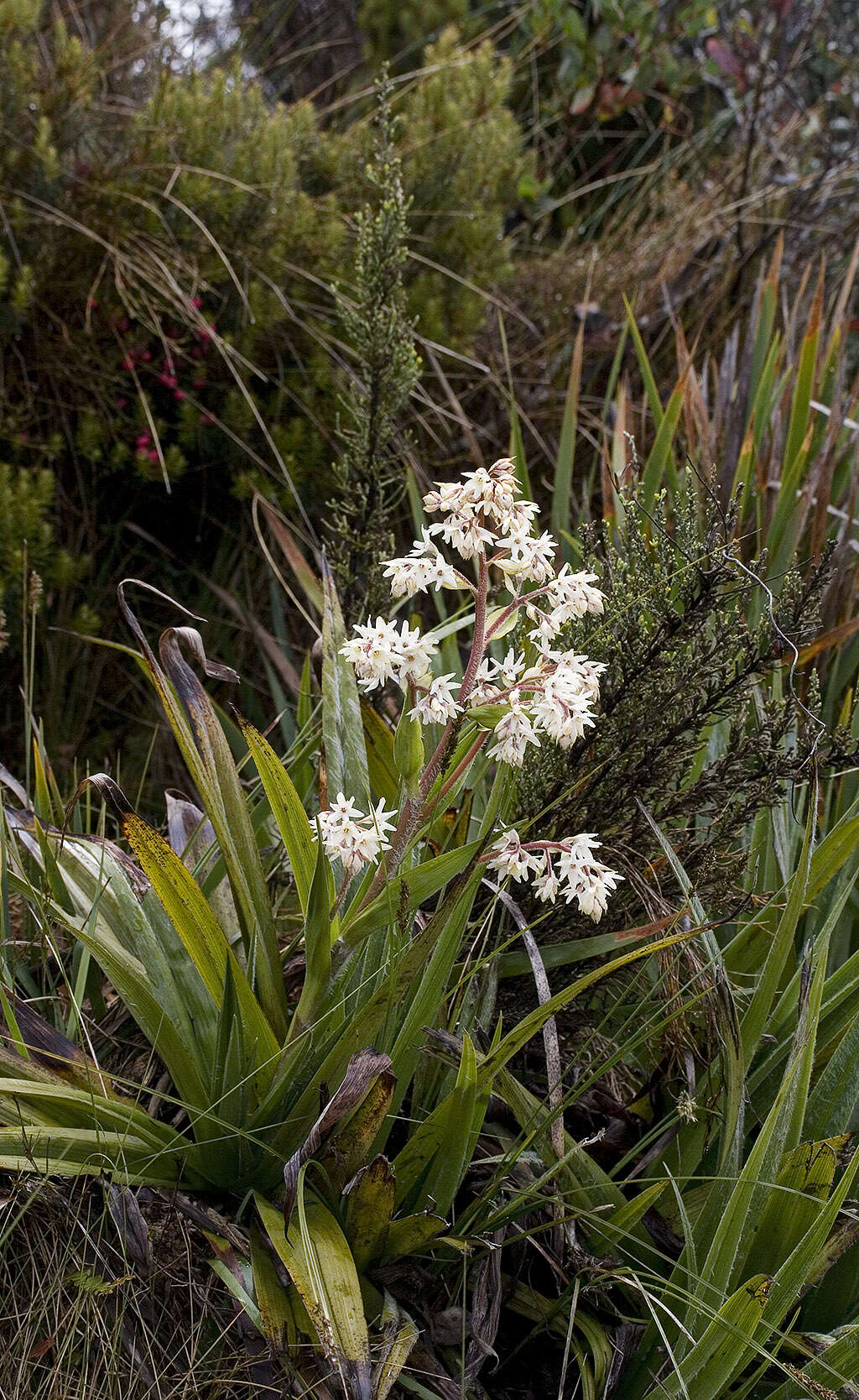
- Milligania densiflora

Scientific classification
- Kingdom: Plantae
- Clade: Tracheophytes
- Clade: Angiosperms
- Clade: Monocots
- Order: Asparagales
- Family: Asteliaceae
- Genus: Milligania; Hook. f.

Species
- See text.

= Milligania =

Genus of plants

Milligania is a genus of native perennial plants containing five species which are all found in Tasmania:

- Milligania densiflora Hook.f.
- Milligania johnstonii F.Muell. ex Benth.
- Milligania lindoniana Rodway ex W.M.Curtis
- Milligania longifolia Hook.f.
- Milligania stylosa (F.Muell. ex Hook.f.) F.Muell. ex Benth.

Formerly belonging to the Liliaceae family, Milligania is now a part of the Asteliaceae family. Three of these species are alpine and subalpine, with the remaining two rare species growing along rivers in the south-west of the state. All five species are restricted to very wet habitats and are typically found growing on waterlogged peat. They are known to form extensive rough mats.

== Description ==
Plants within this genus are perennial, rhizomatous, tufted herbs with short stems, often forming small clumps.

=== Leaves ===
The broad, leathery leaves exhibit a triangular shape with pleats resembling those found in the Astelia genus. Leaves are alternately arranged and sizes vary from quite small, measuring less than 5 cm in length, to large specimens reaching up to 1.25 m in length. These leaves are sheathing in structure, with some silky hairs.

=== Flowers and reproduction ===
The star-like flowers boast six tepals and are prominently displayed in inflorescences above the leaves. The flowers are pedicellate with basally fused tepals which are primarily white, occasionally tinged with red at the tube mouth, with dense silky hairs that are rare in Aparagales. These inflorescences can reach heights of up to 50 cm, with flowers densely arranged in a panicle formation. Each flower, measuring up to 1.5 cm wide, is abundant and spreading during the summer season. Milligania species are all hermaphroditic and produce bisexual flowers.

=== Fruit and seeds ===
Milligania has a dry capsule fruit containing several seeds which contrasts to the fleshy fruit commonly found in the genera Astelia and Neoastelia in the Asteliaceae family. Milligania, and some Astelia species possess trilocular ovaries. Skottsberg proposed that features such as the capsular fruit, bisexual flowers and simple hairs observed in Milligania are primitive traits, or plesiomorphic. Milligania was considered to be divergent from other genera within the Asteliaceae family due to its semi-inferior ovary and dry fruit.

=== Roots ===
Thickened, fleshy roots from a short thick rhizome.

== Distribution and habitat ==
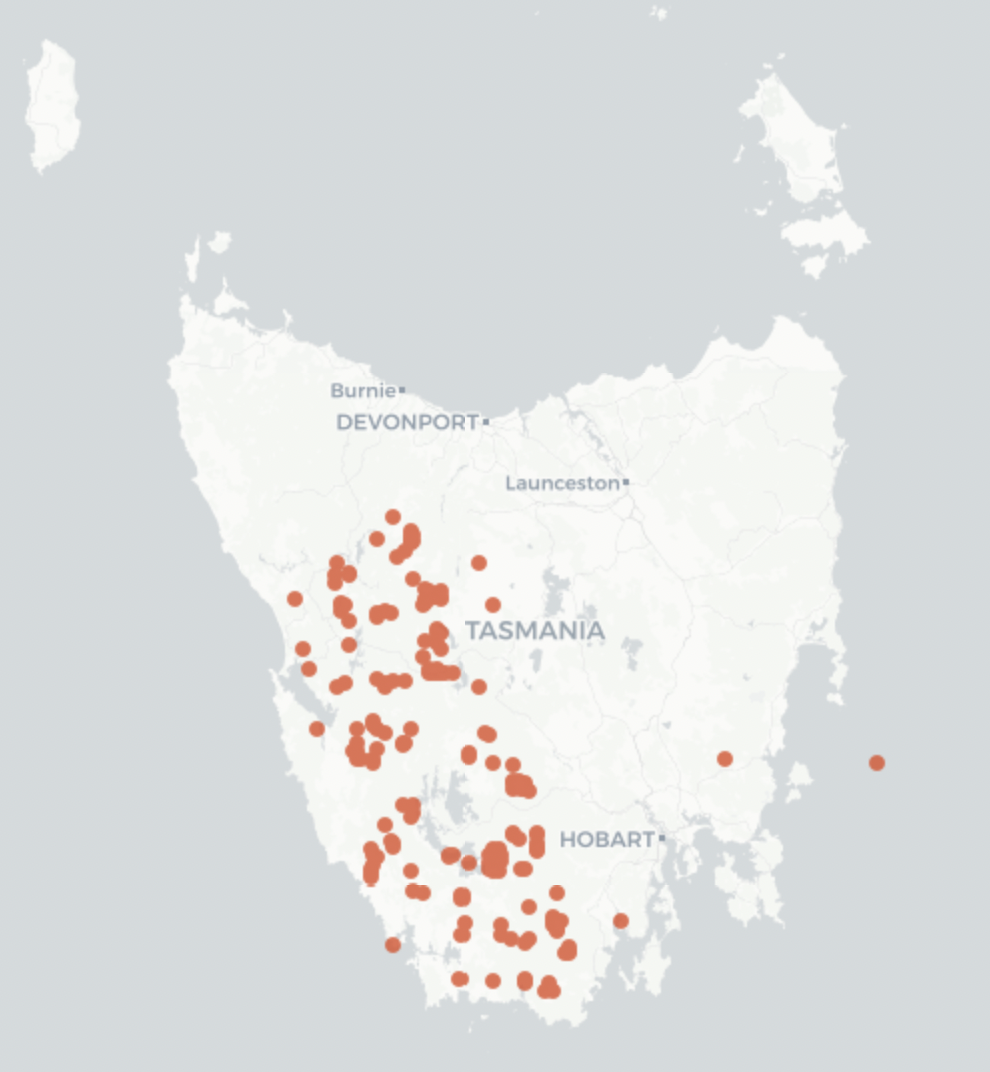
Distribution map of Milligania species in Tasmania.

While Asteliaceae taxa are distributed across Austral and Pacific regions, the primary centre of generic diversity is situated in Australia. All five Milligania species are endemic to Tasmania. According to a distribution map provided by the Atlas of Living Australia, Milligania is mainly distributed on the western side of the state, west of the geographical feature known as Tyler's Corridor. This divide delineates significant differences in Tasmania's geology, climate, and vegetation. Geological composition influences soil types, contributing to dramatic variations in vegetation across the state. The western region typically experiences higher mean rainfall with acidic soils, leading to the prevalence of rainforest, moorland, and wet sclerophyll vegetation. Conversely, the eastern part of the state receives lower mean rainfall and has slightly more fertile soils, resulting in predominantly dry sclerophyll vegetation.

Plants within the Asteliaceae family exhibit a wide range of habitat preferences but generally thrive in environments with consistent moisture levels. They are commonly found in tall, densely clustered habitats. The five Milligania species occupy habitats ranging from lowland riparian valleys to alpine fellfields.

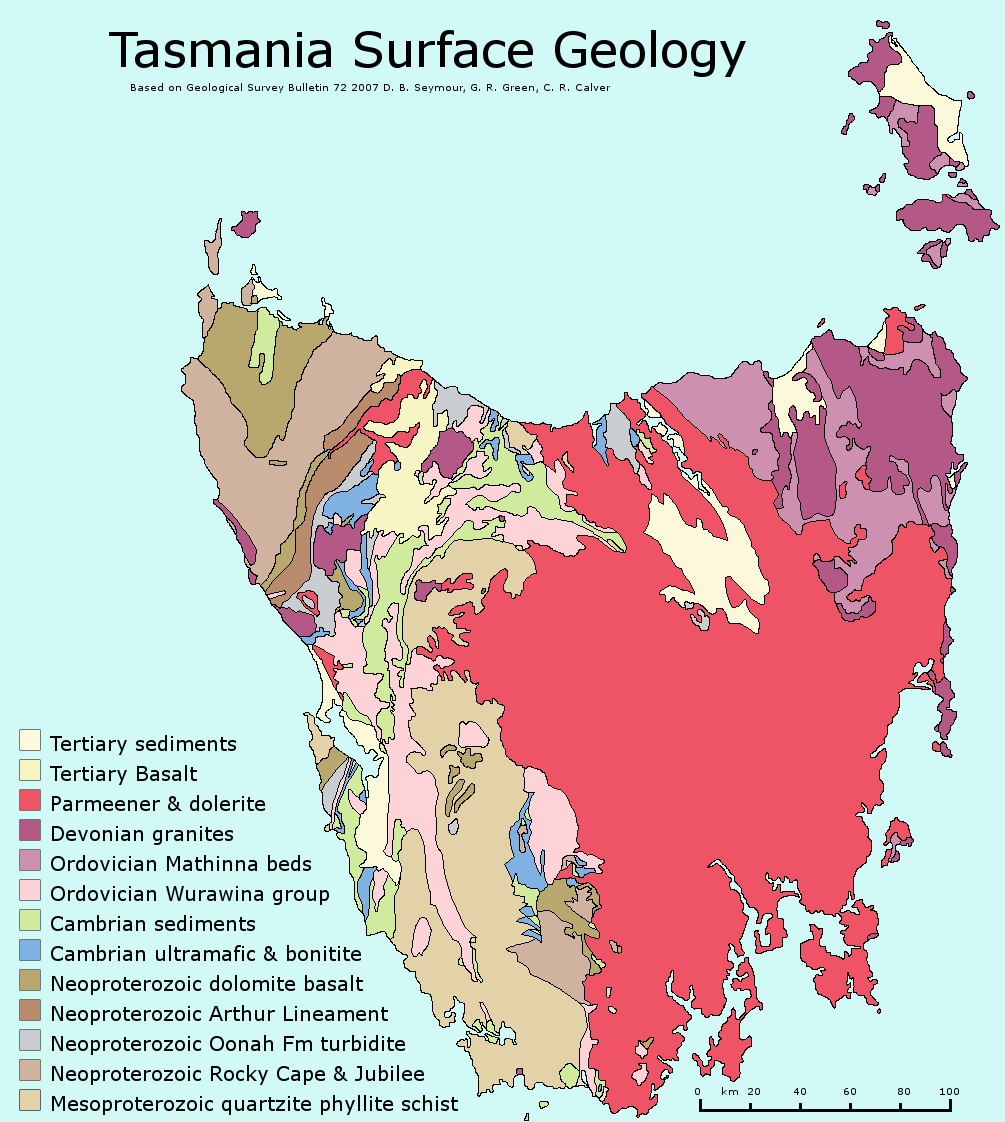
Surface geology of Tasmania

== Taxonomy ==
The genus name 'Milligania' was initially documented in Hooker's J. Bot. Kew Gard. Misc. 5: 296 (1853). However, its placement within the Asteliaceae family has faced challenges due to insufficient support in a cladistic analysis involving both morphological and molecular data. It has been regarded as an outlier within the family, diverging from the typical characteristics observed in other genera. A cladistic study conducted by Maciunas et al. in 2011 revealed a potential sister relationship between the Neoastelia/Milligania and Collospermum/Astelia clades, based on analysis of morphological data.

- Asparagales
  - Orchidaceae
  - - - Boryaceae
      - - Blandfordiaceae
        - - Asteliaceae
          - - Lanariaceae
            - Hypoxidaceae
    - remaining Asparagales families

Within the Asteliaceae family, studies conducted in 2012 and 2013 grouped Milligania with Astelia. A 2021 study placed Neoastelia and Milligania as sisters:

- Asteliaceae
  - - Neoastelia
    - Milligania
  - Astelia

== Conservation status and threats ==
Milligania johnstonii and Milligania longifolia are listed as rare under the Threatened Species Act 1995. Milligania densiflora is not considered to be at risk in the wild. There is no known status for Milligania lindoniana or Milligania stylosa.
