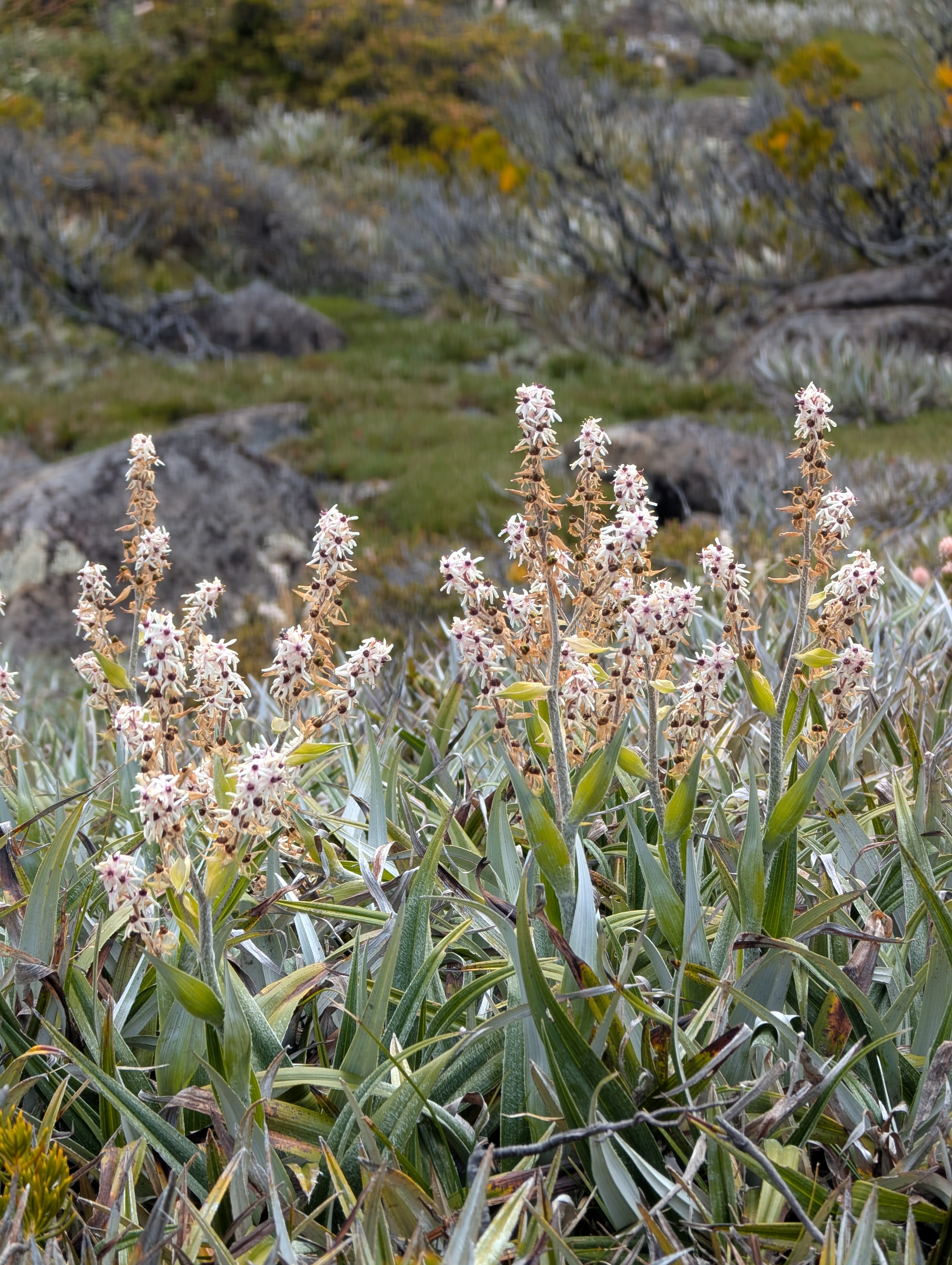
- Milligania lindoniana near K Col, Rodway Range, Mount Field

Scientific classification
- Kingdom: Plantae
- Clade: Tracheophytes
- Clade: Angiosperms
- Clade: Monocots
- Order: Asparagales
- Family: Asteliaceae
- Genus: Milligania
- Species: M. lindoniana

Binomial name
- Milligania lindoniana Rodway ex W.M.Curtis

= Milligania lindoniana =

Species of plant

Milligania lindoniana is a herbaceous perennial plant species endemic to alpine and subalpine Tasmania. It is restricted to the south and west of the state, where it is locally common, particularly around Mount Field, in areas of restricted drainage on peaty soils. The species was first formally described by Winifred M. Curtis in 1972.

Milligania is a small genus of only 5 members, all of which are endemic to Tasmania.

== Description ==
Milligania lindoniana is a tufted perennial herb, with wide, triangular, pleated leaves and dense rhizomes that can form matted colonies. It is superficially similar to the closely related Astelia alpina (pineapple grass), which has a similar habit, but forms larger mats and occurs in similar wet habitat. Although the leaves resemble Astelia alpina, the flowers of Milligania differ in that they are held above the leaves on a long scape, or stem. Although it often grows to 40cm high, plant size and number of flowers can be variable, with some individuals much smaller.

=== Leaves ===
The leaves of Milligania lindoniana are 5-29 cm long, triangular in shape and have pleats along their length. The upper leaf surface is leathery and shiny green, and the undersides are silvery white, covered in fine hairs and have a prominent midvein.

The leaves that surround the stem are tightly sheathed and overlapping.

=== Flowers ===
Flowering stems are 12-40cm long, individual flowers are held in a panicle, or branched inflorescence. Each flower branch is enclosed and supported by a large leafy bract. One individual plant can have as many as 70 flowers. The individual flowers are bisexual (have both male and female parts) and have 6 tepals, which are fused into a tube and are dark red at the base. The colour of the flowers allows easy distinction from Milligania stylosa and densiflora both of which have white flowers and are larger.

=== Fruit and seeds ===
Black, glossy and hard seeds are found in dry capsular fruit, which splits open into 3 valves. This characteristic further distinguishes Milligania from Astelia alpina which has red berries. The distinctly red ovary, which becomes brown as it dries is another distinctive feature when compared with other members of Milligania.

== Taxonomy ==
Originally included in Liliaceae, the genus Milligania was first described by J. D. Hooker in 1853. The genus was named for Joseph Milligan, a Scottish surgeon, colonial administrator, geologist and botanist, who spent 30 years in Tasmania in from 1831.

Contemporary studies have placed Milligania in the family Asteliaceae, after morphological and molecular analyses identified the genus as sister to the other genera, Astelia, Collospermum and Neoastelia. Milligania is a monophyletic clade within Asteliaceae, and shows some divergence from the morphological and molecular characteristics of the sister genera.

Partial phylogeny of Milligania; notably taxon sampling reflected here does not include Milligania longifolia:

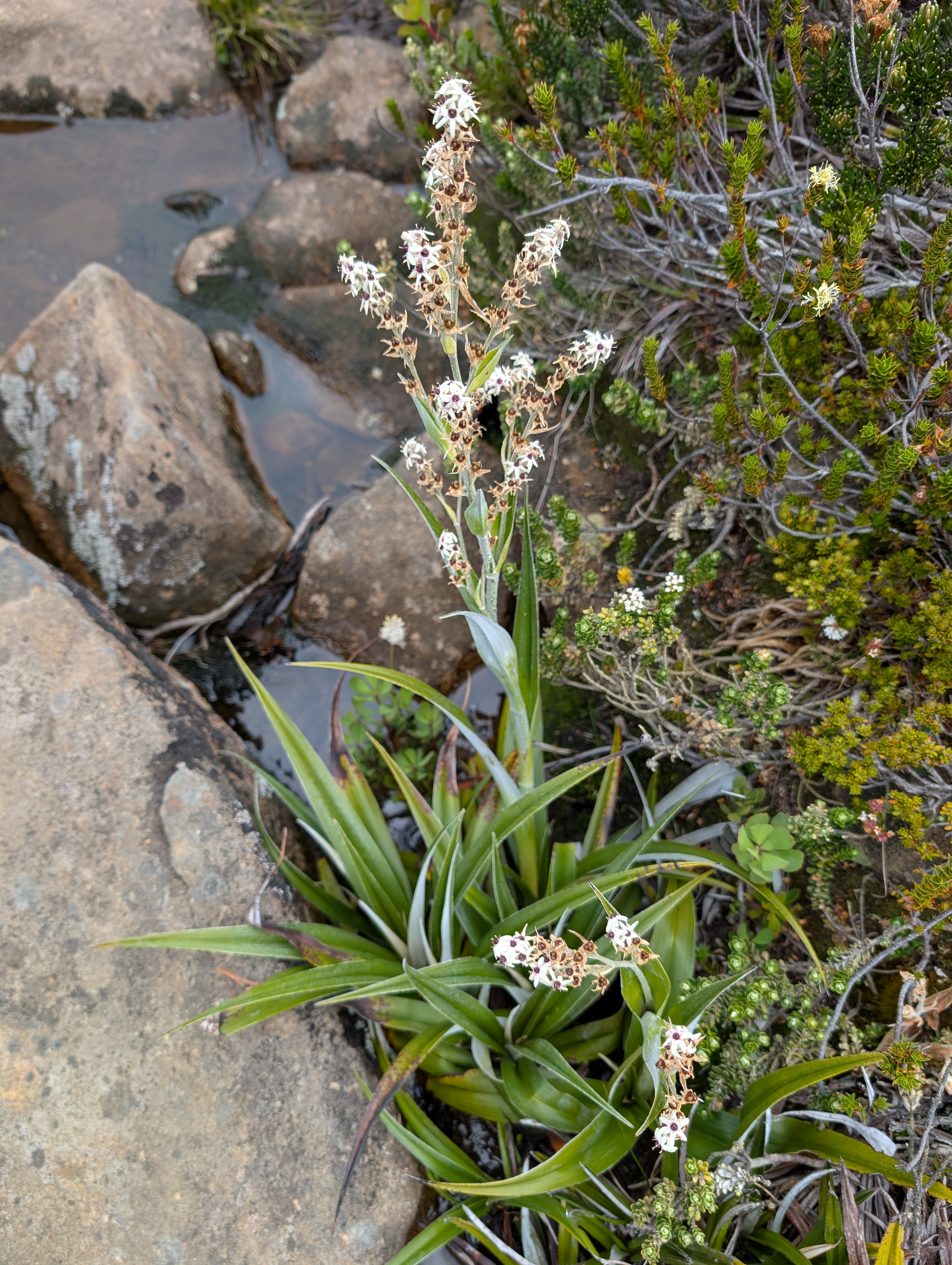
Milligania lindoniana in typical habitat, Mount Field

- Asteliaceae
  - Astelia s.l.
  - - Milligania
      - - Milligania johnstonii
        - Milligania densiflora
      - - Milligania stylosa
        - Milligania lindoniana
    - Neoastelia spectabilis

The first collection of the Milligania lindoniana was in 1923 by "the indefatigable collector" Mrs Lindon from whom the specific epithet originates, and was presented at the annual meeting of the Royal Society of Tasmania by prominent Tasmanian botanist Leonard Rodway. Further herbarium specimens were collected by Mrs Lindon including the type specimen from Mount Field West in 1926.

Although Rodway identified and proposed the species' name in the 1920s, it was not until 1972 that Winifred M. Curtis published a formal description of the species.

== Distribution and habitat ==
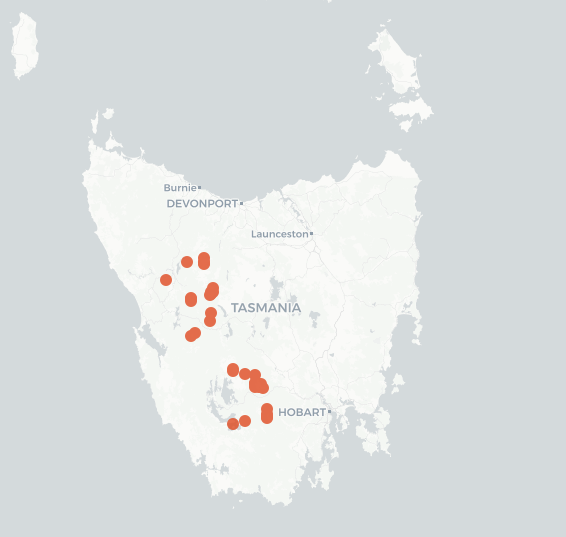
Distribution of Milligania lindonia

The species is restricted entirely to the western half of Tasmania, a region with a unique set of environmental characteristics; predominantly quartzite geology, soils with typically poor nutrient availability and very high rainfall when compared to other regions of the state. The persistence of these environmental conditions, in the context of the remaining elements of Gondwanan flora, has resulted in significant paleo endemism, and localised refugia for species highly specialised to these characteristics.

Studies have dated the divergence of Milligania from Astelia s.l. to the period spanning the divergence of New Zealand from the Gondwanan landmass. This supports the genus's paleoendemic status, and the limited but locally common contemporary distribution of Milligania, along with an absence of documentation in the pollen fossil record, suggests it had a similarly restricted distribution in the past.

Much like all members of the genus Milligania, Milligania lindoniana requires habitat with consistent moisture levels. It occurs in saturated boggy areas in the subalpine and alpine zones adjacent to small watercourses and in patches of peat, where it can be locally common. In alpine herbfields and cushion plant moorland in areas such as Mount Field and Cradle Mountain it grows at altitudes of 1200 to 1500 meters. It can also be found at lower altitudes further to the southwest.

== Conservation status ==
Both of the lowland riparian Milligania species (Milligania johnstonii and Milligania longifolia) are listed as rare in Tasmania, and Milligania densiflora is not considered at risk in the wild. However, no known status applies to the other two alpine species, Milligania stylosa and Milligania lindoniana.
