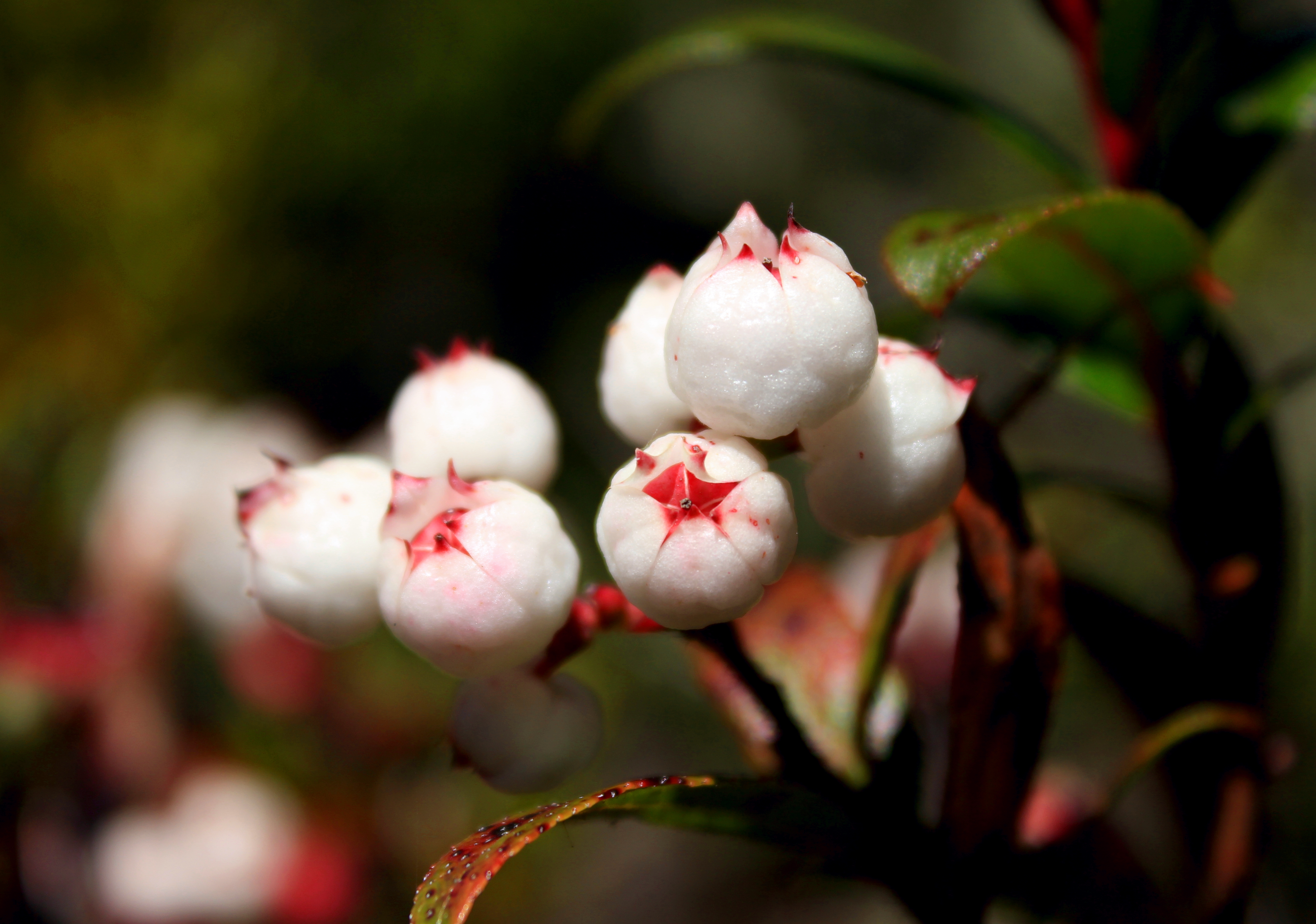
- Gaultheria hispida, Tasman Peninsula, Tasmania

Scientific classification
- Kingdom: Plantae
- Clade: Tracheophytes
- Clade: Angiosperms
- Clade: Eudicots
- Clade: Asterids
- Order: Ericales
- Family: Ericaceae
- Genus: Gaultheria
- Species: G. hispida

Binomial name
- Gaultheria hispida R.Br.

= Gaultheria hispida =

Species of flowering plant

Gaultheria hispida, commonly known as the copperleaf snowberry, is an endemic eudicot of Tasmania, Australia. It is an erect multi-branched shrub, that can be found in wet forests and alpine woodlands. Its berries appear snowy white and leaves are tipped with a copper tinge, hence the common name.

== Description ==
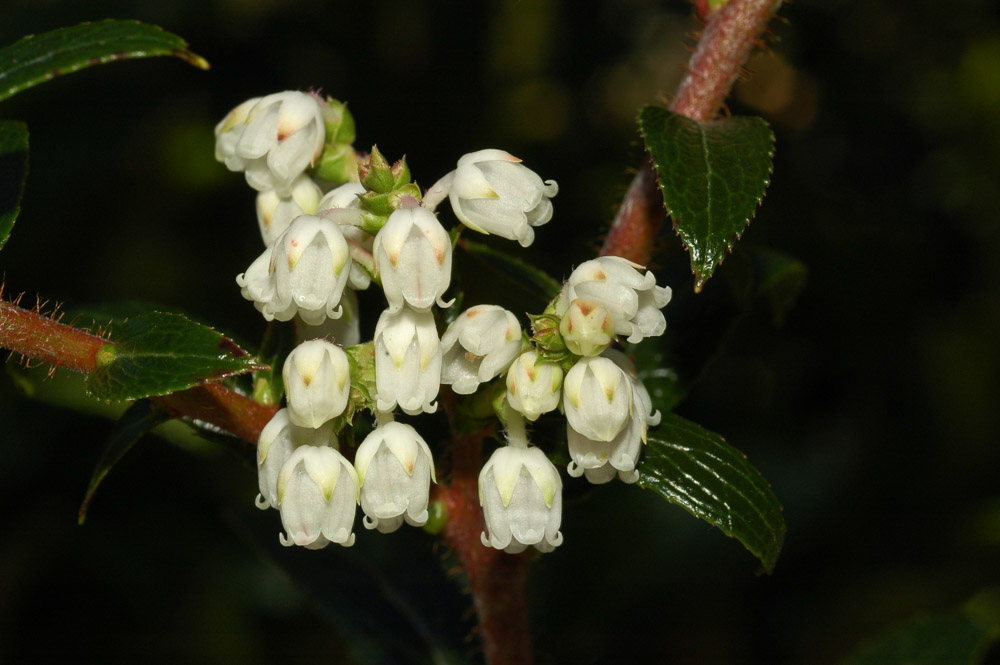
The flowers of Gaultheria hispida.

Gaultheria hispida is a small, erect multi-branched shrub in the family Ericaceae. G. hispida can grow up to 2 m (6 ft 7 in) in a protected site, such as a forest, but will be smaller in more exposed alpine sites. Its leaves grow to be 4–9 cm (1.6–3.5 in) long and appear dark green and glossy with depressed veins and finely serrated leaf margins, tinged copper. Stems are usually red with terminal clusters of small white, urn-shaped flowers at its apex. The plant flowers in Spring through Summer followed by distinctive snowy white sepals enclosing reddish capsules or "fruit" in Autumn.

It is considered to be highly representative of the family Ericaceae for its phylogenetic significance.

== Cultivation ==
G. hispida can be easily propagated from cuttings or seeds, making it a favourable garden plant. They are best suited to a constantly moist, well-drained site, with loamy and or fertile soils.

== Habitat and distribution ==
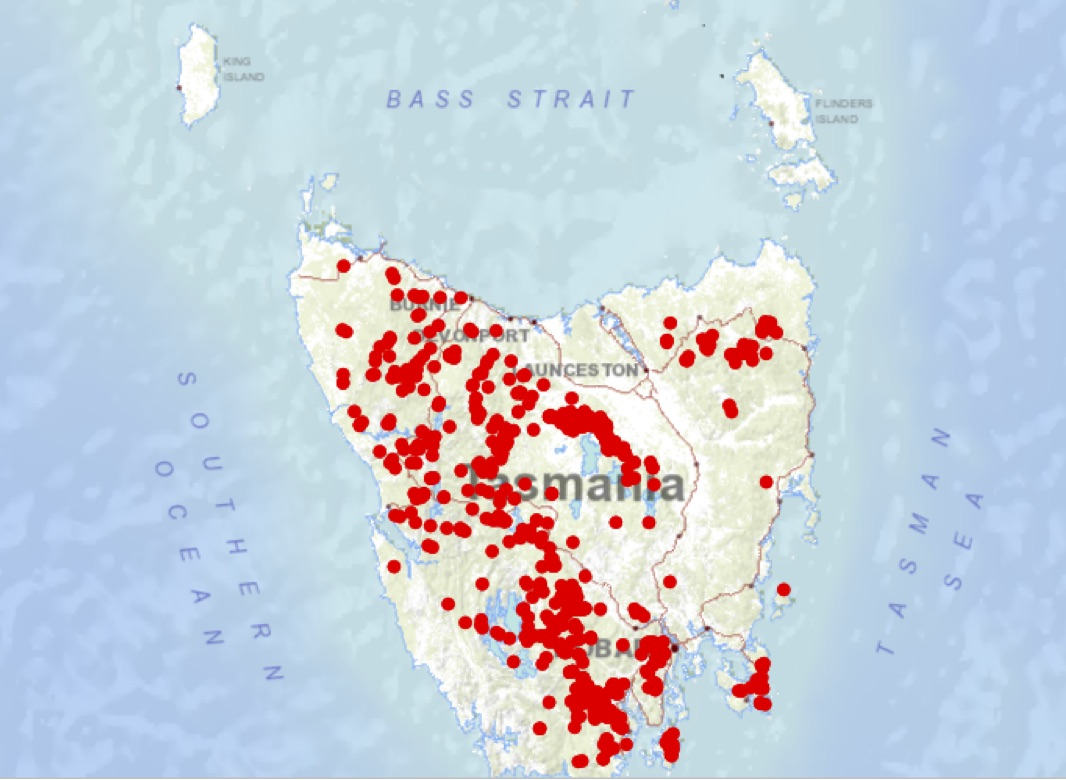
Distribution for G.hispida, in Tasmania, Australia: generated by Tasmanian Natural Values Atlas

The genus Gaultheria is found across Australia, New Zealand, Asia, and North and South America. The plant is found exclusively in Tasmania and some parts of Victoria. The species is considered endangered within Victoria and of conservation significance in Tasmania but is neither threatened nor uncommon. G. hispida is most abundant in cool, moist, mountain or alpine areas, between 250–1,100 m (9,800–43,300 in).

Its distribution is most abundant in the western side of Tasmania, (to the west of Tylers line), on ancient fold province soils, where wet forests and alpine vegetation dominate. Other patches of distribution, to the east of Tyler's line, are predominantly alpine areas, in the northeast, southeast, and central north, on younger fault province soils.

Tasmania's unique geological history of repeated glaciation has enabled many species to expand their geographic range. This glaciation caused the contraction and expansions of alpine zones, thereby dispersing species beyond their initial alpine habitats. Many species then continued to persist in these areas, as is the case with G. hispida.

Other suitable habitats for G. hispida in Tasmania include rainforest, wet eucalypt forest and montane vegetation.

== Uses ==
The fruit of G. hispida are edible and have bitter taste. They were commonly collected by Tasmanian Aboriginal People as bushfood and were eaten by early settlers. Other members of the genus Gaultheria have been used to make teas and jellies, and even claimed to have natural anti-inflammatory properties.

== See also ==
- Variation of Tasmanian vegetation from East to West

== Gallery ==
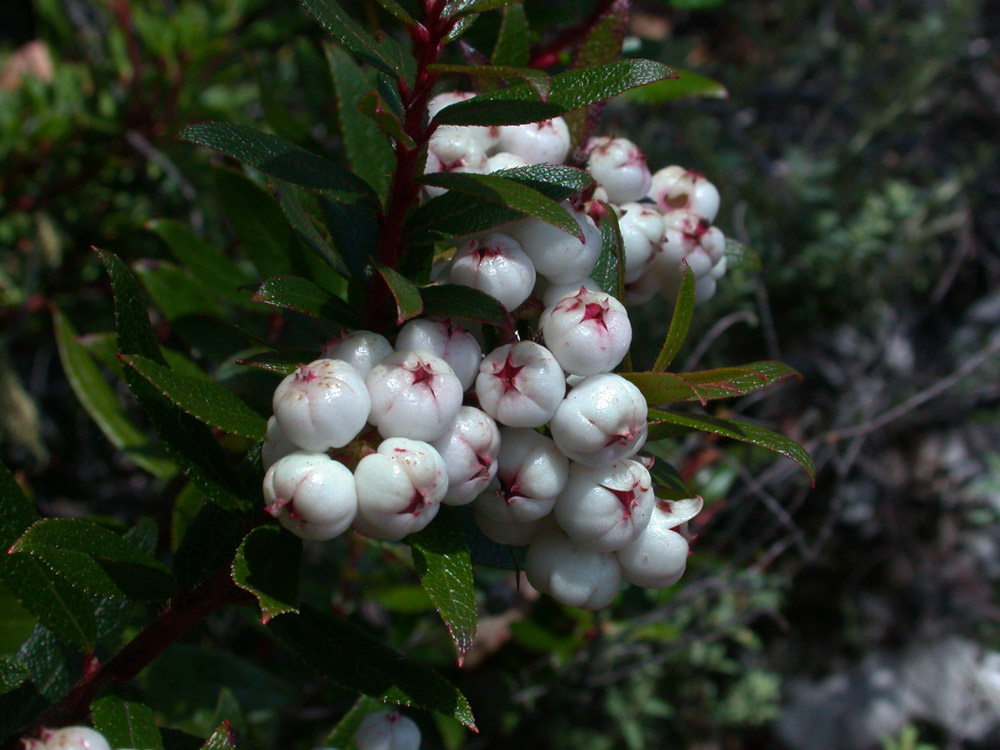
Fruit

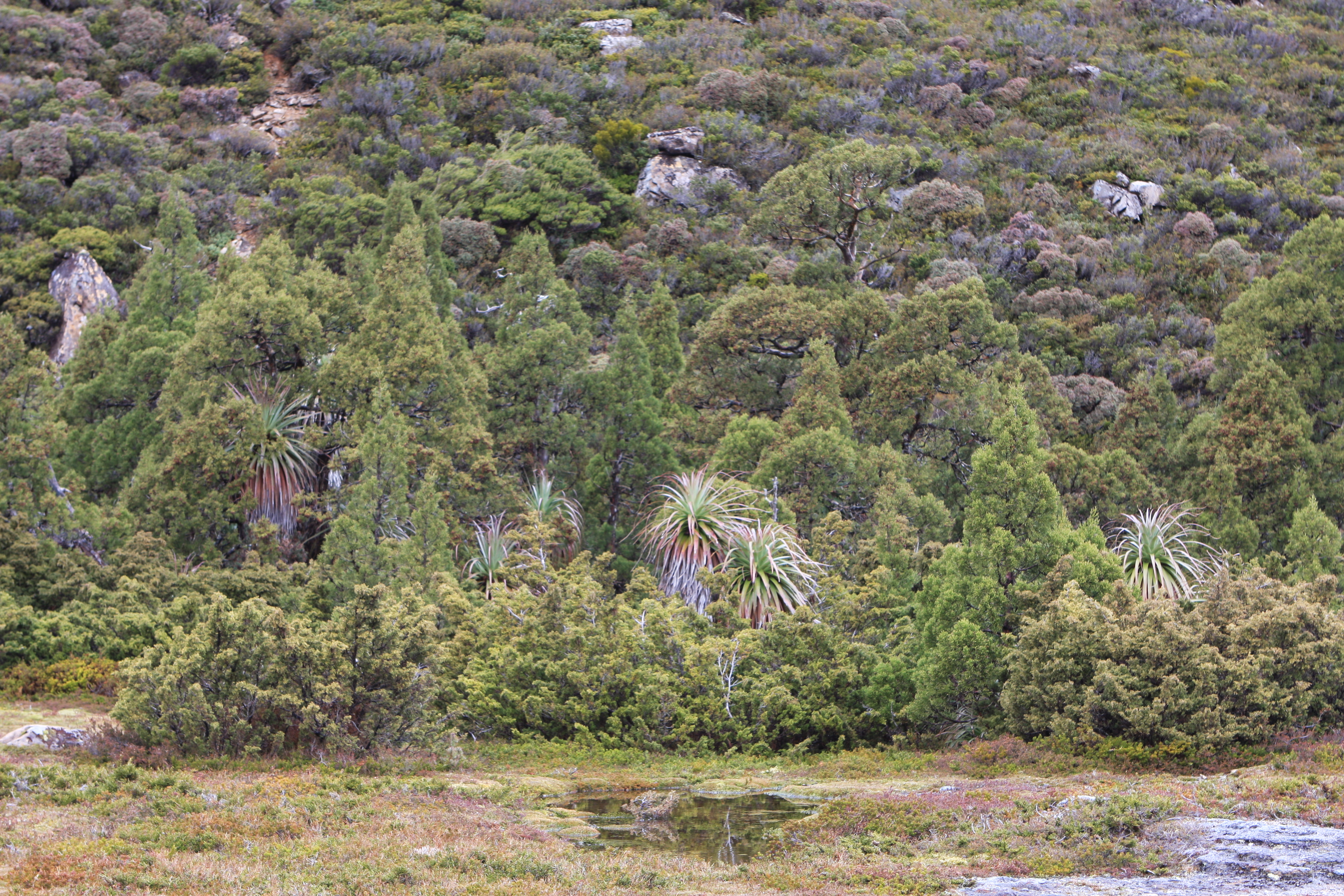
Alpine vegetation in Cradle Mountain National park, where G. hispida is found
