= Tasmanian dry sclerophyll forests =

Dry sclerophyll forests occur throughout northern and eastern Tasmania. Characterised by the population of hard-leafed (sclerophyll) and often spiky, drought-adapted plants, dry sclerophyll forests are found in regions where annual rainfall is below 1000mm.

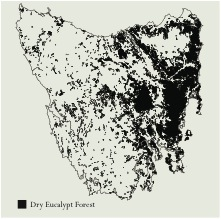
Distribution of dry sclerophyll forest in Tasmania

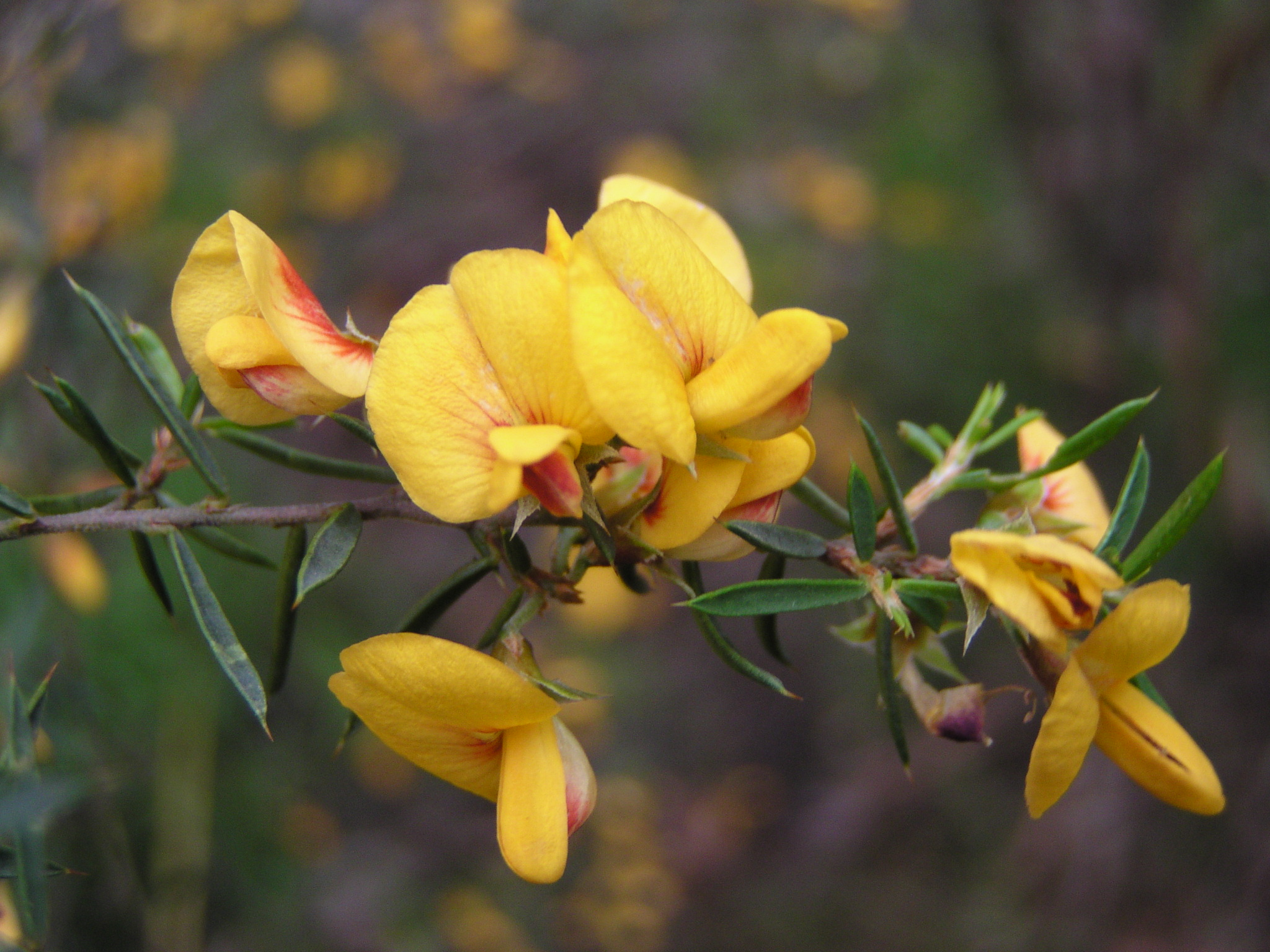
Hard-leafed, often spiky plants such as Pultenaea juniperina

== Climate ==
Dry sclerophyll forests are usually located between 200m and 1000m above sea level, in regions that receive less than 1000mm of rainfall annually. Soils are dry and often infertile and may contain dolerite, granite, quartzite or sandstone. High levels of sunlight are available and temperatures can become high due to the open canopy. The open canopy also causes the forests to be subject to frost

== Structure ==
In Tasmania, dry sclerophyll forests are dominated by Eucalyptus species, with 25 of the 29 Eucalypt species endemic to Tasmania growing in these communities. These trees form a dominant layer but unlike the great heights reached by Eucalyptus regnans in wet sclerophyll and mixed forests, the dryer conditions restrict the height of eucalypts to no more than 30 metres.

Poor nutrient availability in the soil and low rainfall in these areas make it difficult for most species to survive. The large, dominant Eucalypts grow far less dense than in wet sclerophyll forests, increasing the light availability to understory plants and shrubs. This high sunlight is too severe for most species and restricts growth. Few understory plants are found in these communities and are usually restricted to drought-tolerant acacia species and the native cherry (Exocarpus cupressiformis). There are often many grasses (and bracken) in these forests and a sparse hard-leafed shrub layer. Groundcover is often restricted to leaf litter and rocks with patches of sandy soil visible.

The increase in light availability allows the Eucalypts to have greater floristic diversity than found in wet sclerophyll forests.

Growth rates of all plants in dry sclerophyll forests are slow and as water is the limiting factor in these environments, energy for growth is often directed to the roots and lignotubers.

== Understory types ==
=== Grass dominated understory ===
Occurring on dry, fertile sites, the vegetation structure is usually open with heights of 15 to 41 metres. Soil is usually dolerite and flats are subject to frost and cold air-drainage. The shrub layer is sparse and a dense, species rich ground layer of grasses and herbs is present. Typical species include tussock grass, kangaroo grass (Themeda triandra), wallaby grass (Austrodanthonia sp.) and sagg (Lomandra longifolia).

=== Heath dominated understory ===
On dry and infertile sites the shrub layer is dense and species rich. Soil type is often sandstone, quartzite or granite and orchid species may be present. The shrub layer height remains under 2 metres with the tree canopy 15 to 30 metres high. Particularly in recently burnt sites, bracken fern often dominates the ground cover. Typical species present include Epacris species, legumes (Fabaceae), wattles (Acacia sp.), bull-oak (Casuarinaceae) and grasstree (Xanthorrhoea australis). Legumes are an important feature of these environments as they provide nitrogen to the infertile soils (see nitrogen fixation).

=== Sedge dominated understory ===
The dense ground cover of sedges and cord rushes increase the fire frequency of these environments. If fire is infrequent the forest understory structure will change as sedge species have high light requirements that are not met when the canopy becomes dense. It follows therefore, that the canopy cover in these communities is sparse, with a tall understory with variable cover. The dominance of sedges in these communities is caused by their rapid vegetative colonisation after fire, occurring by sprouting from their underground root system. Typical species include cutting grass (Gahnia grandis), sword sedge (Lepidosperma sp.), buttongrass (Gymnoschoenus sphaerocephalus), and rushes. Soil in these environments usually has poor drainage.

=== Shrub dominated understory ===
This type of forest is found on comparatively fertile and well-drained sites. A high rock surface cover persists and a multi-layered shrubby understory is present, but not tall. The increased drainage in these areas permits the growth of members of the ash group of eucalypts to grow in shaded regions and peppermints to grow in more exposed regions. This forest type often contains similar species to those found in wet sclerophyll sites such as the native cherry (Exocarpus cupressiformis), wattles (Acacia sp.), banksia (Banksia sp.), guitar plant (Lomatia tincatoria) and hakea (Hakea sp.).

== Flora ==
=== Plants commonly found in dry sclerophyll forests in Tasmania ===
Family	Species	Habit
Dennstaedtiaceae	Peridium esculentum	Shrub
Ericaceae	Epacris impressa	Shrub
Euphorbiaceae	Amperea xiphoclada	Shrub
Fabaceae	Aotus ericoides	Shrub
Fabaceae	Daviesia latifolia	Shrub
Fabaceae	Daviesia ulicifolia	Shrub
Fabaceae	Pultenaea daphnoides	Shrub
Fabaceae	Pultenaea juniperina	Shrub
Haloragaceae	Gonocarpus tetragynous	Shrub/groundcover
Haloragaceae	Gonocarpus teucrioides	Shrub
Lauraceae	Cassytha glabella	Parasitic climber
Liliaceae	Dianella revoluta	Shrub
Mimosaceae	Acacia dealbata	Understory tree
Mimosaceae	Acacia melanoxylon	Understory tree
Myrtaceae	Eucalyptus amygdalina	Dominant tree
Myrtaceae	Eucalyptus obliqua	Dominant tree
Myrtaceae	Leptospermum scoparium	Shrub
Pittosporaceae	Rhytidosporum procumbens	Shrub
Proteaceae	Banksia marginata	Shrub
Proteaceae	Persoonia juniperina	Shrub
Santalaceae	Exocarpus cupressiformis	Understory tree
Santalaceae	Leptomeria drupaceae	Shrub
Tremandraceae	Tetratheca pilosa	Shrub

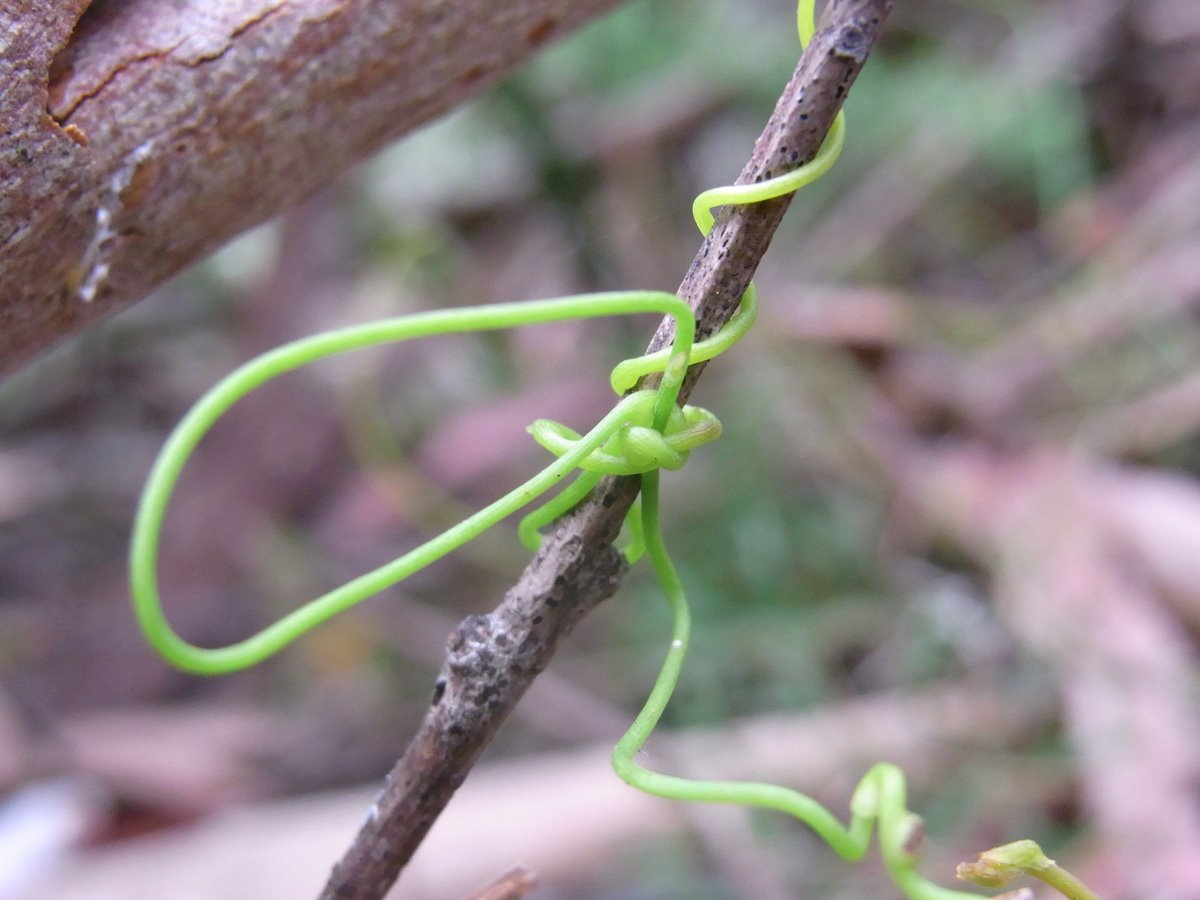
Growth habit of Cassytha glabella

== Fauna ==
Grazing mammalian species including wallabies, pademelons and wombats are often associated with dry sclerophyll communities. Arboreal species such as the possum may also be found in these communities, as well as numerous birds and reptiles including skinks and the blue-tongued lizard.

== Regeneration ==
Dry sclerophyll forests in Tasmania are populated with Eucalyptus species that rely on fire for regeneration. These forests are often multi-aged and the age gap between trees can indicate the time between fires. Eucalypt species produce seed within hard capsules requiring physical stress like fire to release the seed.

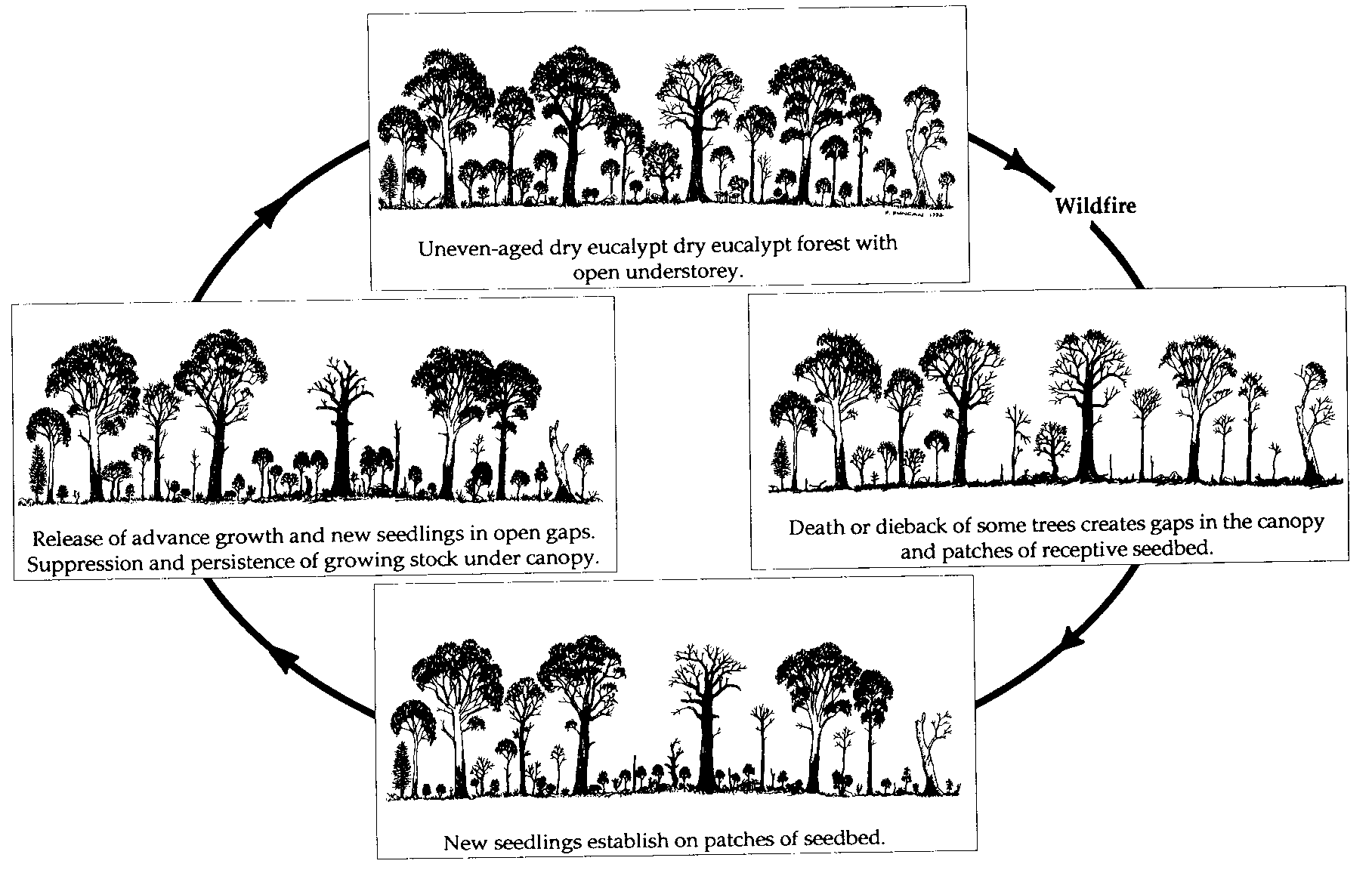
Life cycle and structure of eucalpyt dominated dry sclerophyll forests

== Forestry practices ==
Clear felling in dry sclerophyll forests is rarely recommended due to the wastage of pre-existing advance growth, problems with establishing regeneration, maintenance and protection of non-wood values and aesthetics. Other forestry methods are applied in such forests throughout Tasmania such as strip-felling and clump retention. The dry nature and high percentage of plants requiring fire for regeneration make these forests suitable for regeneration burning after forestry practises have been performed.
