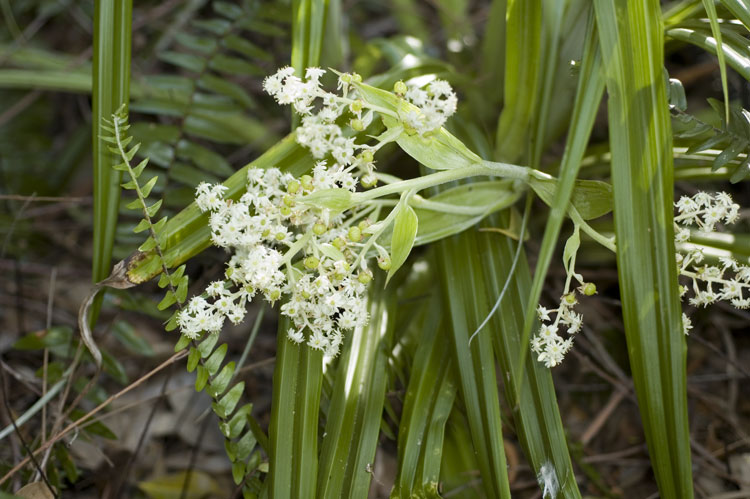

Conservation status
- Vulnerable (EPBC Act)

Scientific classification
- Kingdom: Plantae
- Clade: Tracheophytes
- Clade: Angiosperms
- Clade: Monocots
- Order: Asparagales
- Family: Asteliaceae
- Genus: Neoastelia; J.B.Williams
- Species: N. spectabilis

Binomial name
- Neoastelia spectabilis J.B.Williams

= Neoastelia =

Silver sword lily

Genus of flowering plants

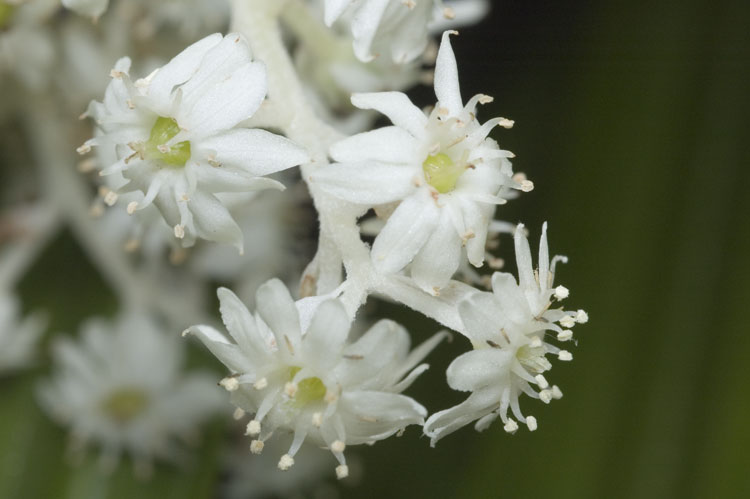
Flower detail

Neoastelia is a genus of plants in the family Asteliaceae containing the single species Neoastelia spectabilis, commonly known as the silver sword lily, that is endemic to a small area on the Northern Tablelands of New South Wales, Australia. It is a species of herb with long, linear leaves and large groups of whitish flowers, followed by spherical, pale green berries.

== Description ==
Neoastelia spectabilis is a tufted herb with more or less linear leaves 600–1,650 mm (24–65 in) long and 25–60 mm (0.98–2.36 in) wide with drooping ends, and silvery white on the lower surface. The flowers are arranged in panicles 240–700 mm (9.4–27.6 in) long on a thick peduncle 180–400 mm (7.1–15.7 in) long. Each panicle consists of smaller, many-flowered racemes with a spathe at the base, the individual flowers whitish and 15–18 mm (0.59–0.71 in) wide on a pedicel 4–17 mm (0.16–0.67 in) long. Flowering occurs from November to December and the fruit is an oval to spherical, pale green berry 11–15 mm (0.43–0.59 in) long containing between 70 and 150 small black seeds.

== Taxonomy ==
Neoastelia spectabilis was first formally described in 1987 by J.B. Williams in Flora of Australia from specimens he collected in 1978.

== Distribution and habitat ==
Silver sword lily grows in rocks crevices near waterfalls and on wet rocks in the New England National Park in Antarctic beech (Nothofagus moorei) forest, at altitudes between 900 and 1,150 m (2,950 and 3,770 ft).

== Conservation status ==
This species is listed as "vulnerable" under the Australian Government Environment Protection and Biodiversity Conservation Act 1999 and the New South Wales Government Biodiversity Conservation Act 2016. The main threats to the species include trampling by walkers, illegal collection and its small population size. It is only known from four populations in the New England National Park.
