= Sclerophyll =

Type of plant/vegetation

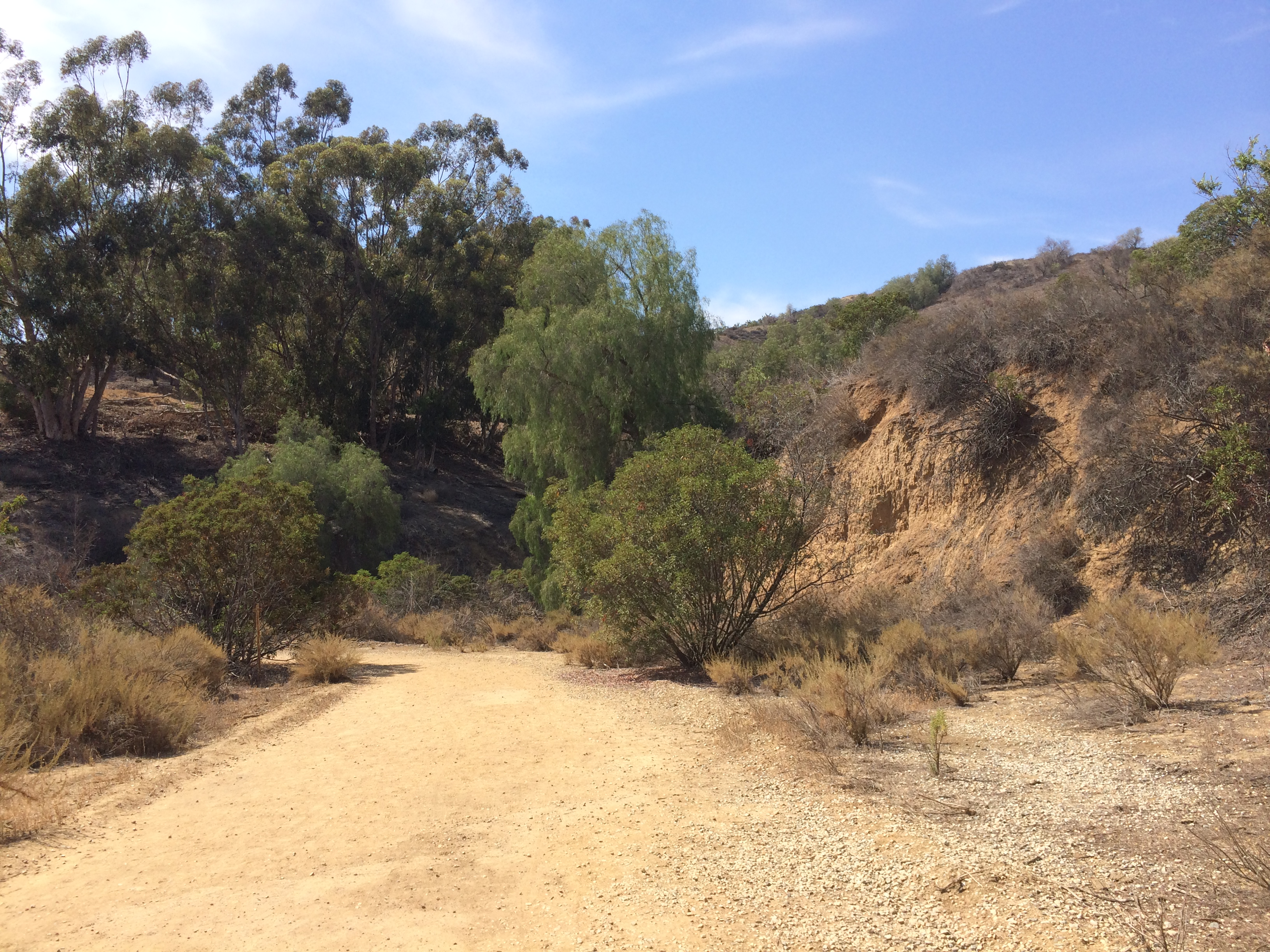
Chaparral vegetation in Southern California

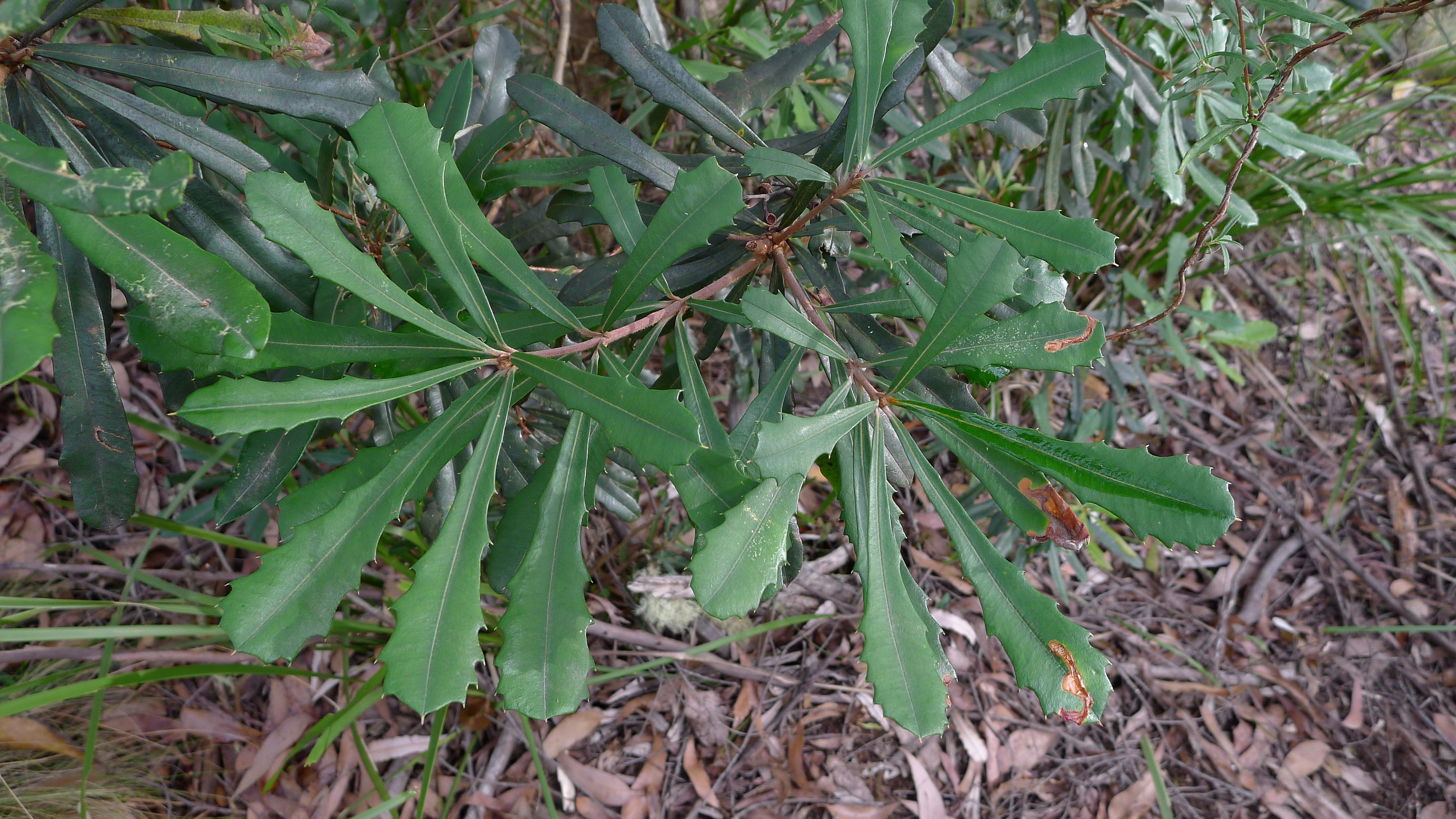
The hard leaves of a Banksia integrifolia (notice the short internodes)

Sclerophyll is a type of vegetation that is adapted to long periods of dryness and heat. The plants feature hard leaves, short internodes (the distance between leaves along the stem) and leaf orientation which is parallel or oblique to direct sunlight.

Sclerophyllous plants occur in many parts of the world, but are most typical of areas with low rainfall or seasonal droughts, such as Australia, Africa, and western North and South America. They are prominent throughout Australia, parts of Argentina, the Cerrado biogeographic region of Bolivia, Paraguay and Brazil, and in the Mediterranean biomes that cover the Mediterranean Basin, California, Chile, and the Cape Province of South Africa.

In the Mediterranean basin, holm oak, cork oak and olives are typical hardwood trees. In addition, there are several species of pine under the trees in the vegetation zone. The shrub layer contains numerous herbs such as rosemary, thyme and lavender. In relation to the potential natural vegetation, around 2% of the Earth's land surface is covered by sclerophyll woodlands, and a total of 10% of all plant species on Earth live there.

== Etymology ==
The word comes from the Greek sklēros (hard) and phyllon (leaf). The term was coined by Andreas Franz Wilhelm Schimper in 1898 (translated in 1903), originally as a synonym of xeromorph, but the two words were later differentiated.

== Description ==
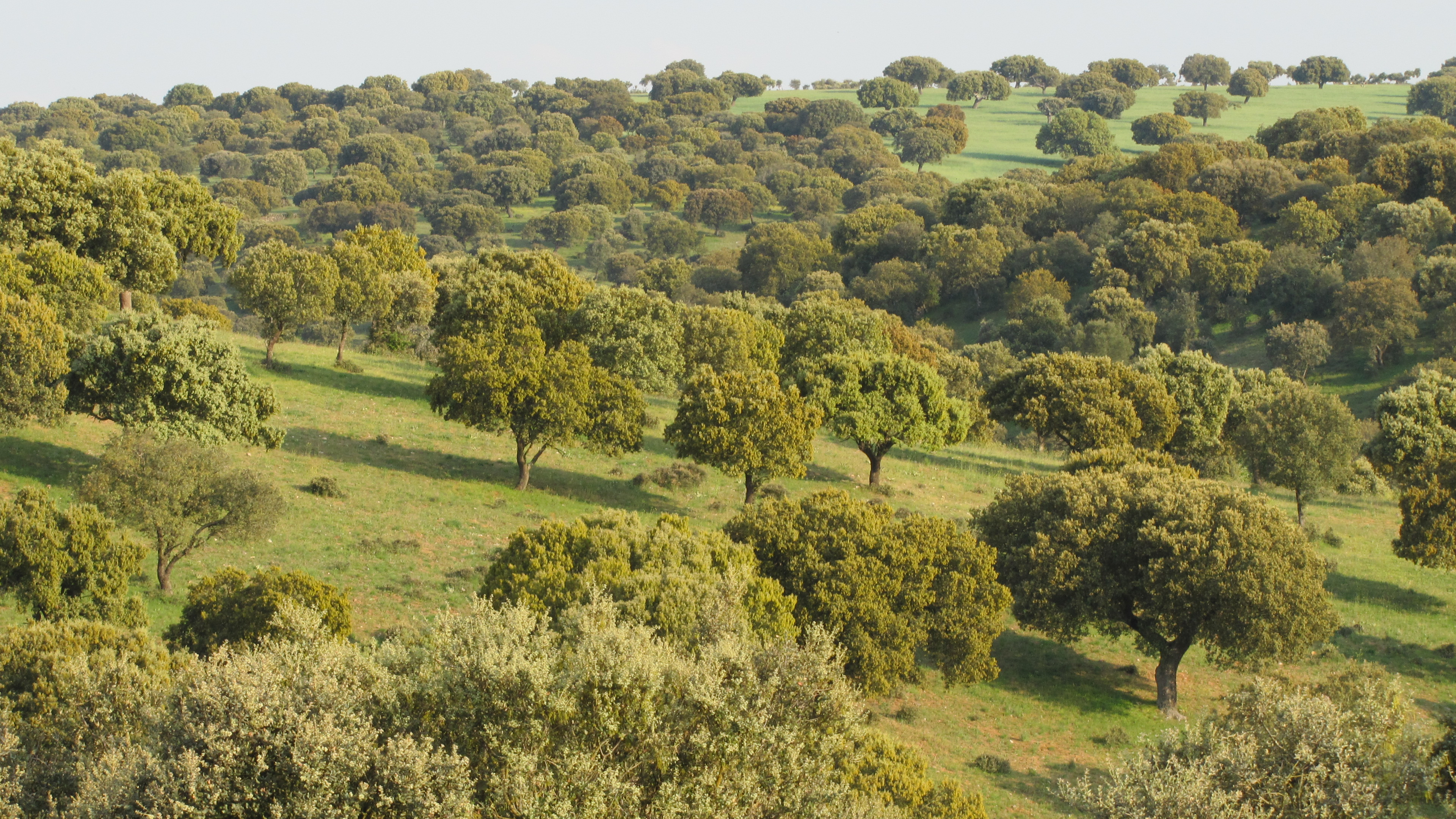
Sclerophyllous woodland in Spain

Sclerophyll woody plants are characterized by their relatively small, stiff, leathery and long-lasting leaves. The sclerophyll vegetation is the result of an adaptation of the flora to the summer dry period of a Mediterranean-type climate.

Plant species with this type of adaptation tend to be evergreen with great longevity, slow growth and with no loss of leaves during the unfavorable season. As a result, the thickets that make up these ecosystems are of the persistent evergreen type, in addition to the predominance of plants, even herbaceous ones, with "hard" leaves, which are covered by a thick leathery layer called the cuticle, that prevents water loss during the dry season. The aerial and underground structures of these plants are modified to make up for water shortages that may affect their survival.

The name sclerophyll derives from the highly developed sclerenchyma from the plant, which is responsible for the hardness or stiffness of the leaves. This structure of the leaves inhibits transpiration and thus prevents major water losses during the dry season. Most of the plant species in the sclerophyll zone are not only insensitive to summer drought, they have also used various strategies to adapt to frequent wildfires, heavy rainfall and nutrient deficiencies.

== Ecology ==
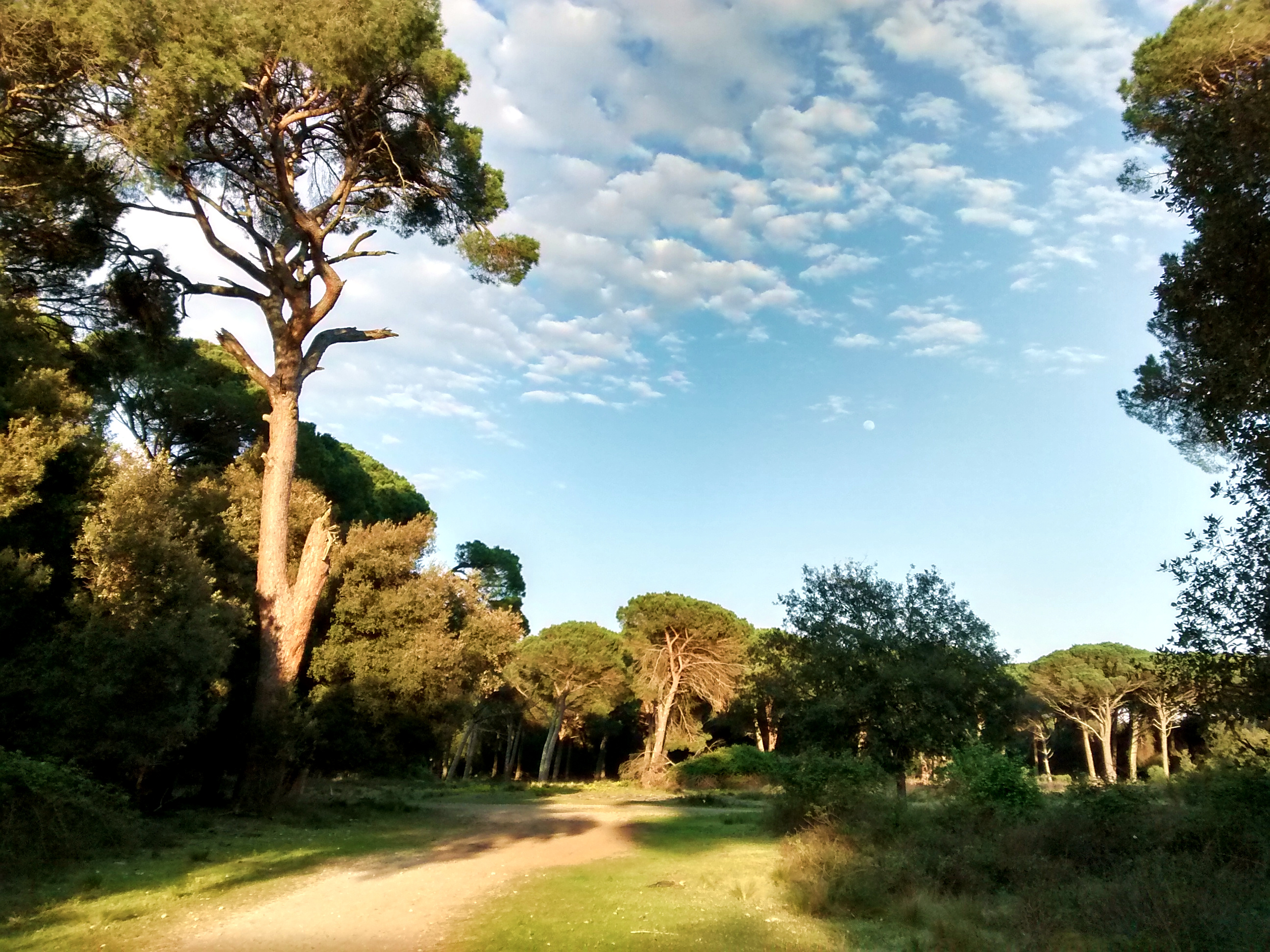
Sclerophyll woodland in Tuscany, Italy

The type of sclerophyllic trees in the Palearctic flora region include the holm oak (Quercus ilex), myrtle (Myrtus communis), strawberry tree (Arbutus unedo), wild olive (Olea europaea), laurel (Laurus nobilis), mock privet (Phillyrea latifolia), the Italian buckthorn (Rhamnus alaternus), etc.

- In central and southern California, the coastal hills are covered in sclerophyll vegetation known as chaparral. The flora of this ecoregion also includes tree species scrub oak (Quercus dumosa), California buckeye (Aesculus californica), San Gabriel Mountain liveforever (Dudlea densiflora), Catalina mahogany (Cercocarpus traskiae), and the threatened jewelflower (Streptanthus albidus ssp. Peramoenus).
- In South Africa, in the Cape region, there are Mediterranean open forests known as fynbos. The abundance of endemics is so extraordinary (68% of the 8600 vascular plant species in the area) that the South African sclerophyll area, the cape flora, forms the smallest of the six flora kingdoms on earth. Plants include Elegia, Thamnochortus, and Willdenowia and proteas such as king protea (Protea cynaroides) and blushing bride (Serruria florida).
- In most of Australia, sclerophyll vegetation such as eucalyptus trees, melaleucas, banksias, callistemons and grevilleas dominate the mallee and woodland areas of its cities, including those lacking a Mediterranean climate, such as Sydney, Melbourne, Hobart and Brisbane.
- In Chile, south of the desert areas, there is evergreen bushland called matorral. Typical species include Litre (Lithraea venenosa), Quillay or Soapbark Tree (Quillaja saponaria), and bromeliads of genus Puya.

== Climate ==
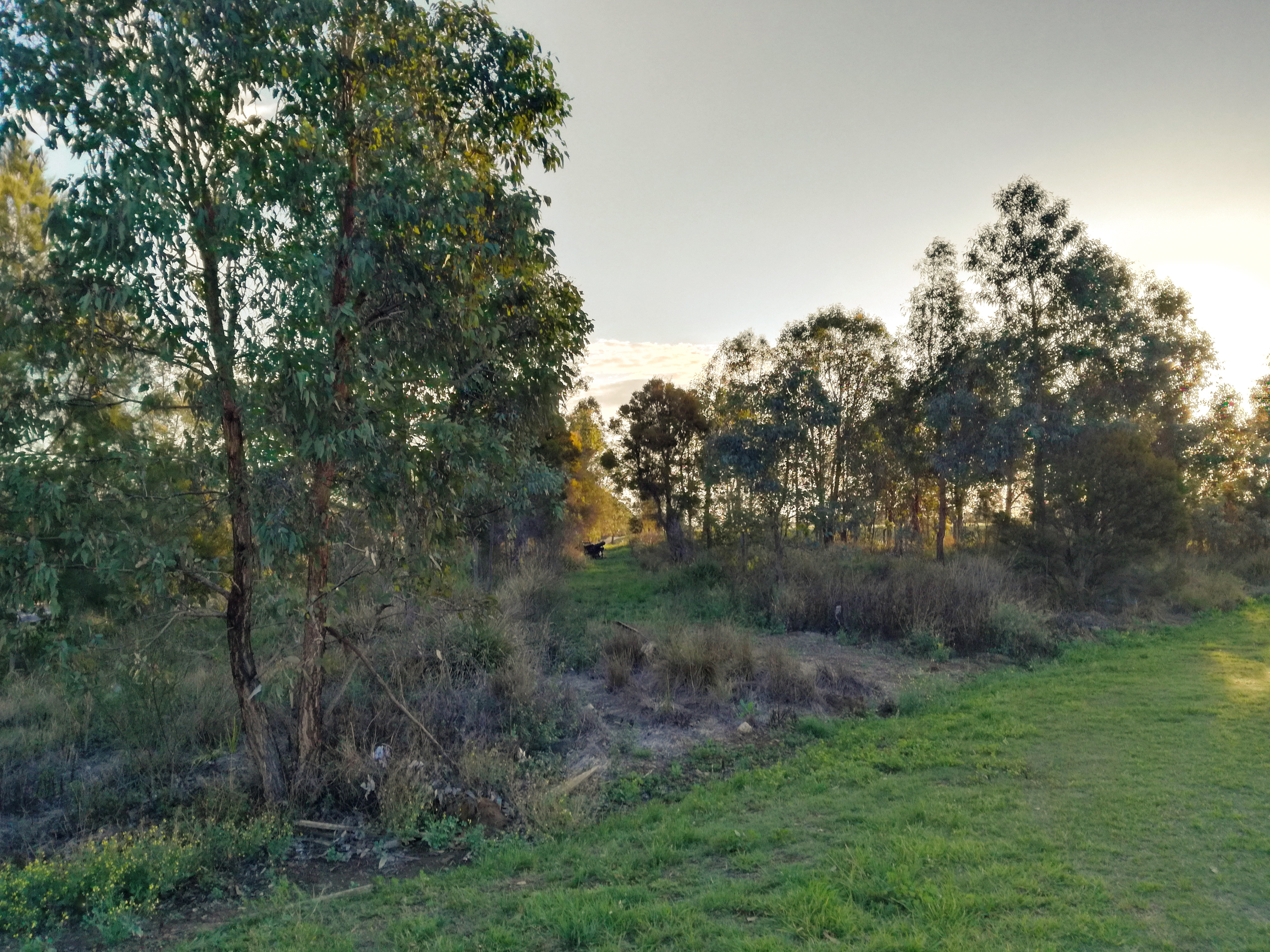
A sclerophyll bushland in Sydney (which falls in the humid subtropical zone)

The sclerophyll regions are located in the outer subtropics bordering the temperate zone (also known as the warm-temperate zone). Accordingly, the annual average temperatures are relatively high at 12–24 °C (54–75 °F); An average of over 18 °C (64 °F) is reached for at least four months, eight to twelve months it is over 10 °C (50 °F) and no month is below 5 °C (41 °F) on average. Frost and snow occur only occasionally and the growing season lasts longer than 150 days and is in the winter half-year. The lower limit of the moderate annual precipitation is 300 mm (12 in) (semi-arid climate) and the upper limit 900–1,000 mm (35–39 in).

Generally, the summers are dry and hot with a dry season of a maximum of seven months, but at least two to three months. The winters are rainy and cool. However, not all regions with sclerophyll vegetation feature the classic Mediterranean climate; parts of eastern Italy, eastern Australia and eastern South Africa, which feature sclerophyll woodlands, tend to have uniform rainfall or even a more summer-dominant rainfall, whereby falling under the humid subtropical climate zone (Cfa/Cwa). Furthermore, other areas with sclerophyll flora would grade to the oceanic climate (Cfb); particularly the eastern parts of the Eastern Cape province in South Africa, and Tasmania, Victoria and southern New South Wales in Australia.

== Soils ==
Sclerophyll plants are also found in areas with nutrient-poor and acidic soils, and soils with heavy concentrations of aluminum and other metals. Sclerophyll leaves transpire less and have a lower CO_{2} uptake than malacophyllous or laurophyllous leaves. These lower transpiration rates may reduce the uptake of toxic ions and better provide for C-carboxylation under nutrient-poor conditions, particularly low availability of mineral nitrogen and phosphate. Sclerophyllous plants are found in tropical heath forests, which grown on nutrient-poor sandy soils in humid regions in the Orinoco and the Rio Negro basins of northern South America on quartz sand, in the kerangas forests of Borneo and on the Malay Peninsula, in coastal sandy areas along the Gulf of Guinea in Gabon, Cameroon, and Côte d'Ivoire, and in eastern Australia. Since water drains rapidly through these soils, sclerophylly also protects plants against drought stress during dry periods.

Sclerophylly's advantages in nutrient-poor conditions may be another factor in the prevalence of sclerophyllous plants in nutrient-poor areas in drier-climate regions, like much of Australia and the Cerrado of Brazil.

== Distribution ==
The zone of the sclerophyll vegetation lies in the border area between the subtropics and the temperate zone, approximately between the 30th and 40th degree of latitude (in the northern hemisphere also up to the 45th degree of latitude). Their presence is limited to the coastal western sides of the continents, but nonetheless can typical in any regions of a continent with scarce annual precipitation or frequent seasonal droughts and poor soils that are heavily leached.

The sclerophyll zone often merges into temperate deciduous forests towards the poles, on the coasts also into temperate rainforests and towards the equator in hot semi-deserts or deserts. The Mediterranean areas, which have a very high biodiversity, are under great pressure from the population. This is especially true for the Mediterranean region since ancient times. Through overexploitation (logging, grazing, agricultural use) and frequent fires caused by people, the original forest vegetation is converted. In extreme cases, the hard-leaf vegetation disappears completely and is replaced by open rock heaths.

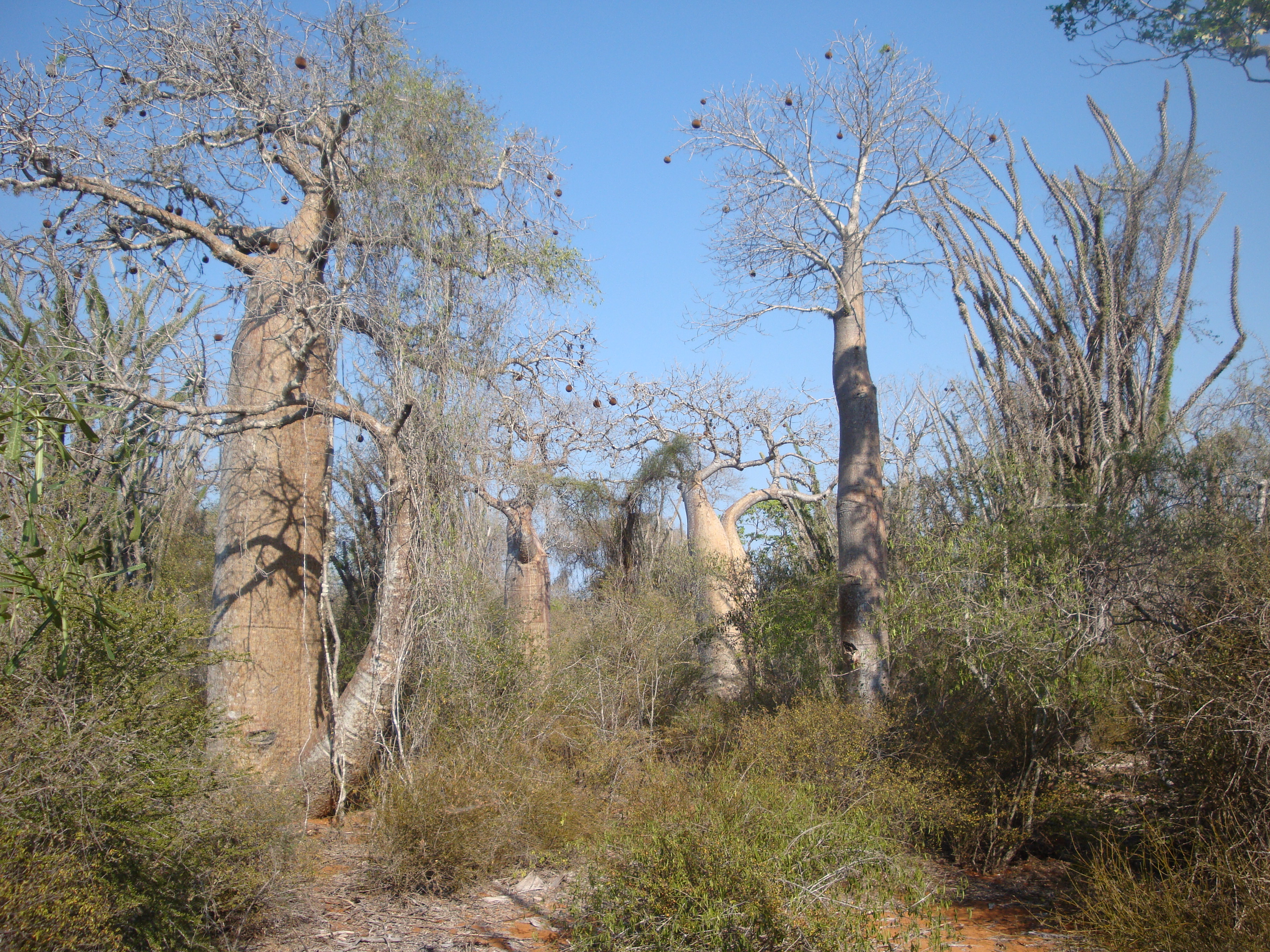
Sclerophyll shrubland in southwestern Madagascar

Some sclerophyll areas are closer to the equator than the Mediterranean zone—for example, the interior of Madagascar, the dry half of New Caledonia, the lower edge areas of the Madrean pine-oak woodlands of the Mexican highlands between 800 and 1,800 metres (2,600 and 5,900 ft) or around 2,000 m (6,600 ft) high plateaus of the Asir Mountains on the western edge of the Arabian Peninsula.

=== Land use ===
While the winter rain areas of America, South Africa and Australia, with an unusually large variety of food crops, were ideal gathering areas for hunter-gatherers until European colonization, agriculture and cattle breeding spread in the Mediterranean area since the Neolithic, which permanently changed the face of the landscape. In the sclerophyll regions near the coast, permanent crops such as olive and wine cultivation established themselves; However, the landscape forms that characterize the degenerate shrubbery and shrub heaths maquis and garrigue are predominantly a result of grazing (especially with goats).

In the course of the last millennia, the original vegetation in almost all areas of this vegetation zone has been greatly changed by the influence of humans. Where the plants have not been replaced by vineyards and olive groves, the maquis was the predominant form of vegetation on the Mediterranean. The maquis has been degraded in many places to the low shrub heather, the garrigue. Many plant species that are rich in aromatic oils belong to both vegetation societies. The diversity of the original sclerophyll vegetation in the world is high to extremely high (3,000–5,000 species per hectare).

== Australian bush ==
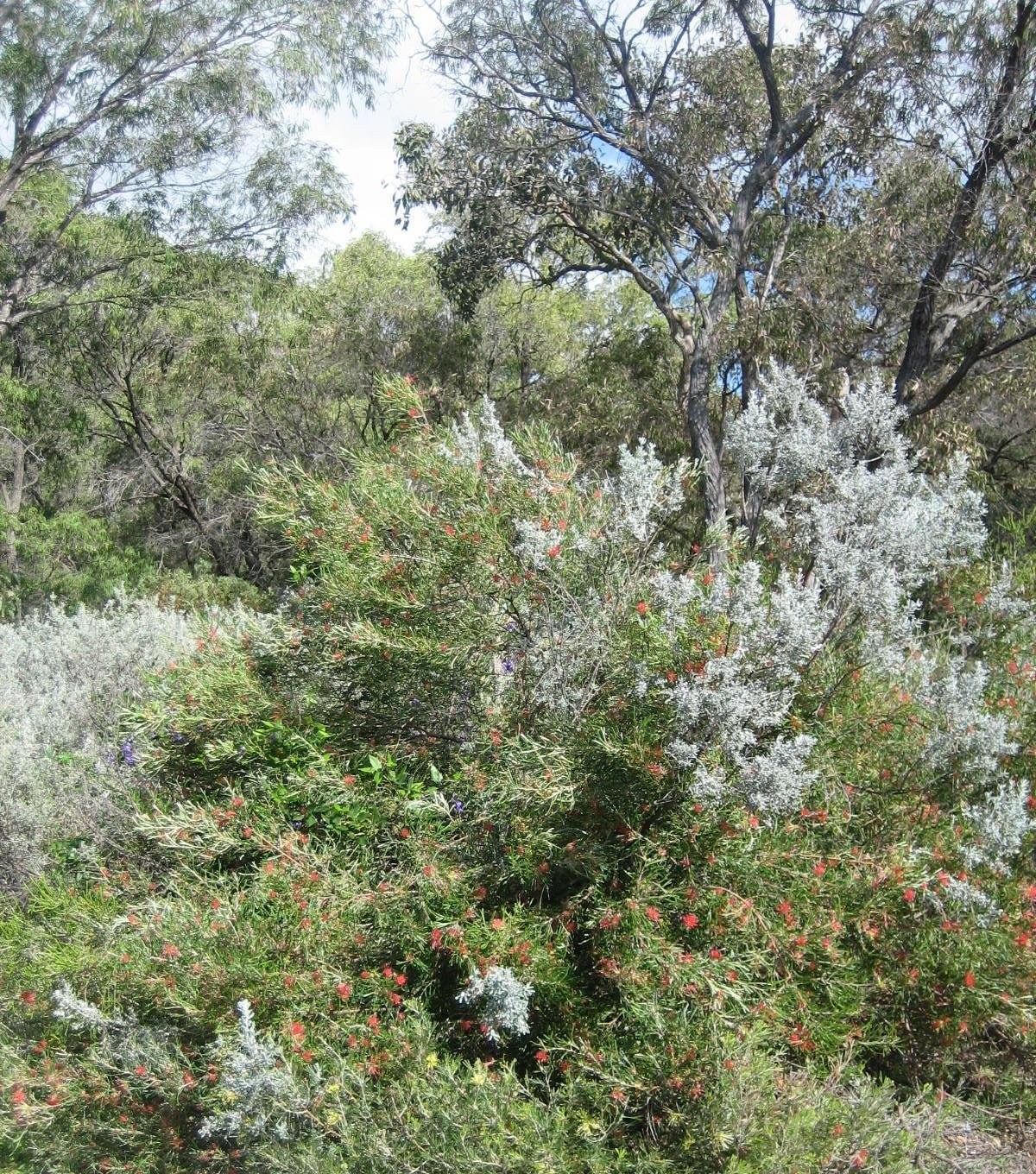
Bush around Eagle Bay, Western Australia

Most areas of the Australian continent able to support woody plants are occupied by sclerophyll communities as forests, savannas, or heathlands. Common plants include the Proteaceae (grevilleas, banksias and hakeas), tea-trees, acacias, boronias, and eucalypts.

The most common sclerophyll communities in Australia are savannas dominated by grasses with an overstorey of eucalypts and acacias. Acacia (particularly mulga) shrublands also cover extensive areas. All the dominant overstorey acacia species and a majority of the understorey acacias have a scleromorphic adaptation in which the leaves have been reduced to phyllodes consisting entirely of the petiole.

Many plants of the sclerophyllous woodlands and shrublands also produce leaves unpalatable to herbivores by the inclusion of toxic and indigestible compounds which assure survival of these long-lived leaves. This trait is particularly noticeable in the eucalypt and Melaleuca species which possess oil glands within their leaves that produce a pungent volatile oil that makes them unpalatable to most browsers. These traits make the majority of woody plants in these woodlands largely unpalatable to domestic livestock. It is therefore important from a grazing perspective that these woodlands support a more or less continuous layer of herbaceous ground cover dominated by grasses.

Sclerophyll forests cover a much smaller area of the continent, being restricted to relatively high rainfall locations. They have a eucalyptus overstory (10 to 30 metres) with the understory also being hard-leaved. Dry sclerophyll forests are the most common forest type on the continent, and although it may seem barren dry sclerophyll forest is highly diverse. For example, a study of sclerophyll vegetation in Seal Creek, Victoria, found 138 species.

=== Wet sclerophyll forest ===
Even less extensive are wet sclerophyll forests. They have a taller eucalyptus overstory than dry sclerophyll forests, 30 metres (98 ft) or more (typically mountain ash, alpine ash, rose gum, karri, messmate stringybark, or manna gum, and a soft-leaved, fairly dense understory (tree ferns are common). They require ample rainfall—at least 1000 mm (40 inches).

=== Evolution ===
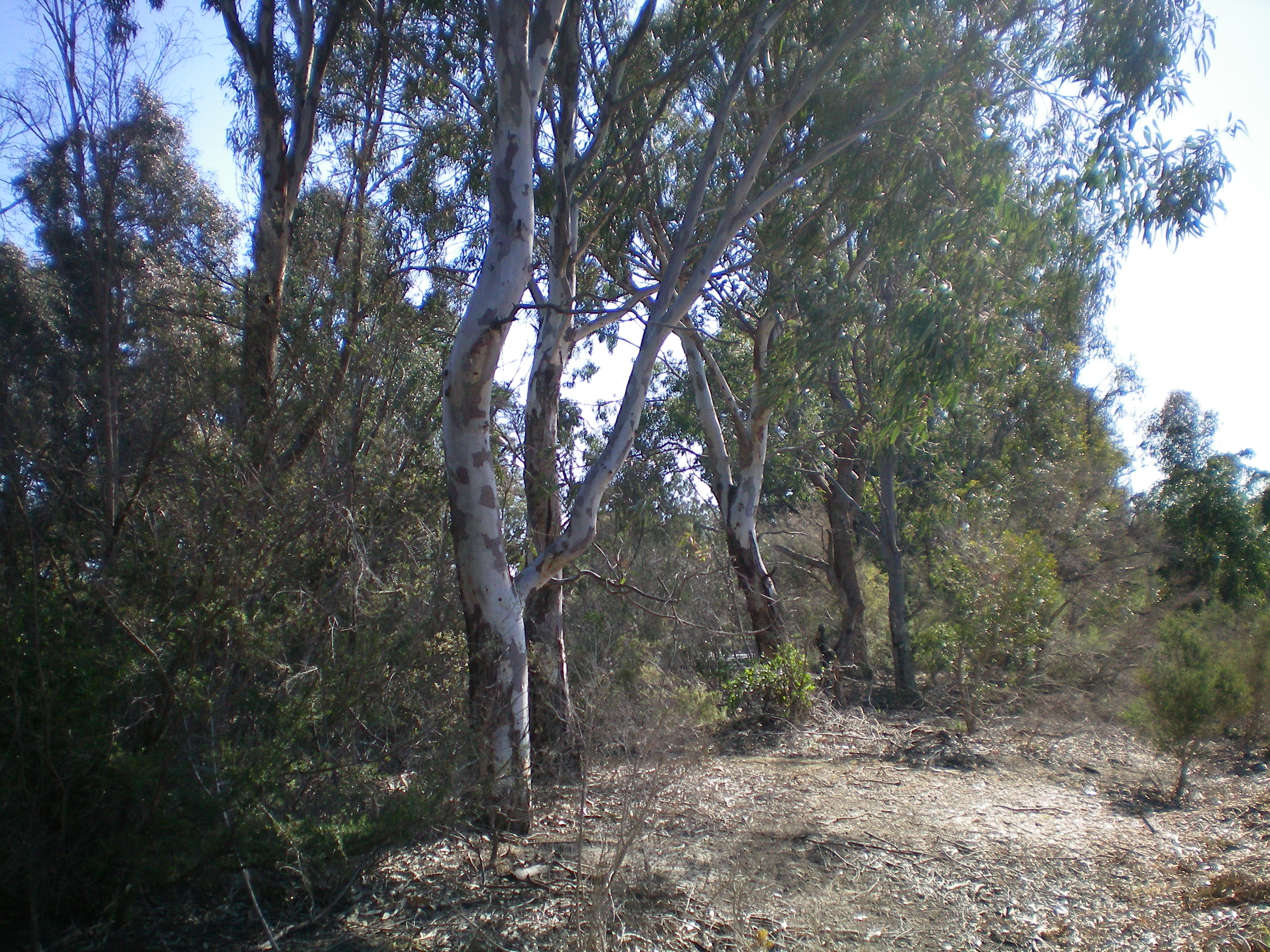
Yellow box (Eucalyptus melliodora) in a sclerophyll woodland, Melbourne (Cfb climate)

Sclerophyllous plants are all part of a specific environment and are anything but newcomers. By the time of European settlement, sclerophyll forest accounted for the vast bulk of the forested areas.

Most of the wooded parts of present-day Australia have become sclerophyll dominated as a result of the extreme age of the continent combined with Aboriginal fire use. Deep weathering of the crust over many millions of years leached chemicals out of the rock, leaving Australian soils deficient in nutrients, particularly phosphorus. Such nutrient deficient soils support non-sclerophyllous plant communities elsewhere in the world and did so over most of Australia prior to European arrival. However such deficient soils cannot support the nutrient losses associated with frequent fires and are rapidly replaced with sclerophyllous species under traditional Aboriginal burning regimens. With the cessation of traditional burning non-sclerophyllous species have re-colonized sclerophyll habitat in many parts of Australia.

The presence of toxic compounds combined with a high carbon : nitrogen ratio make the leaves and branches of scleromorphic species long-lived in the litter, and can lead to a large build-up of litter in woodlands. The toxic compounds of many species, notably Eucalyptus species, are volatile and flammable and the presence of large amounts of flammable litter, coupled with an herbaceous understorey, encourages fire.

All the Australian sclerophyllous communities are liable to be burnt with varying frequencies and many of the woody plants of these woodlands have developed adaptations to survive and minimise the effects of fire.

Sclerophyllous plants generally resist dry conditions well, making them successful in areas of seasonally variable rainfall. In Australia, however, they evolved in response to the low level of phosphorus in the soil—indeed, many native Australian plants cannot tolerate higher levels of phosphorus and will die if fertilised incorrectly. The leaves are hard due to lignin, which prevents wilting and allows plants to grow, even when there is not enough phosphorus for substantial new cell growth.

== Regions ==
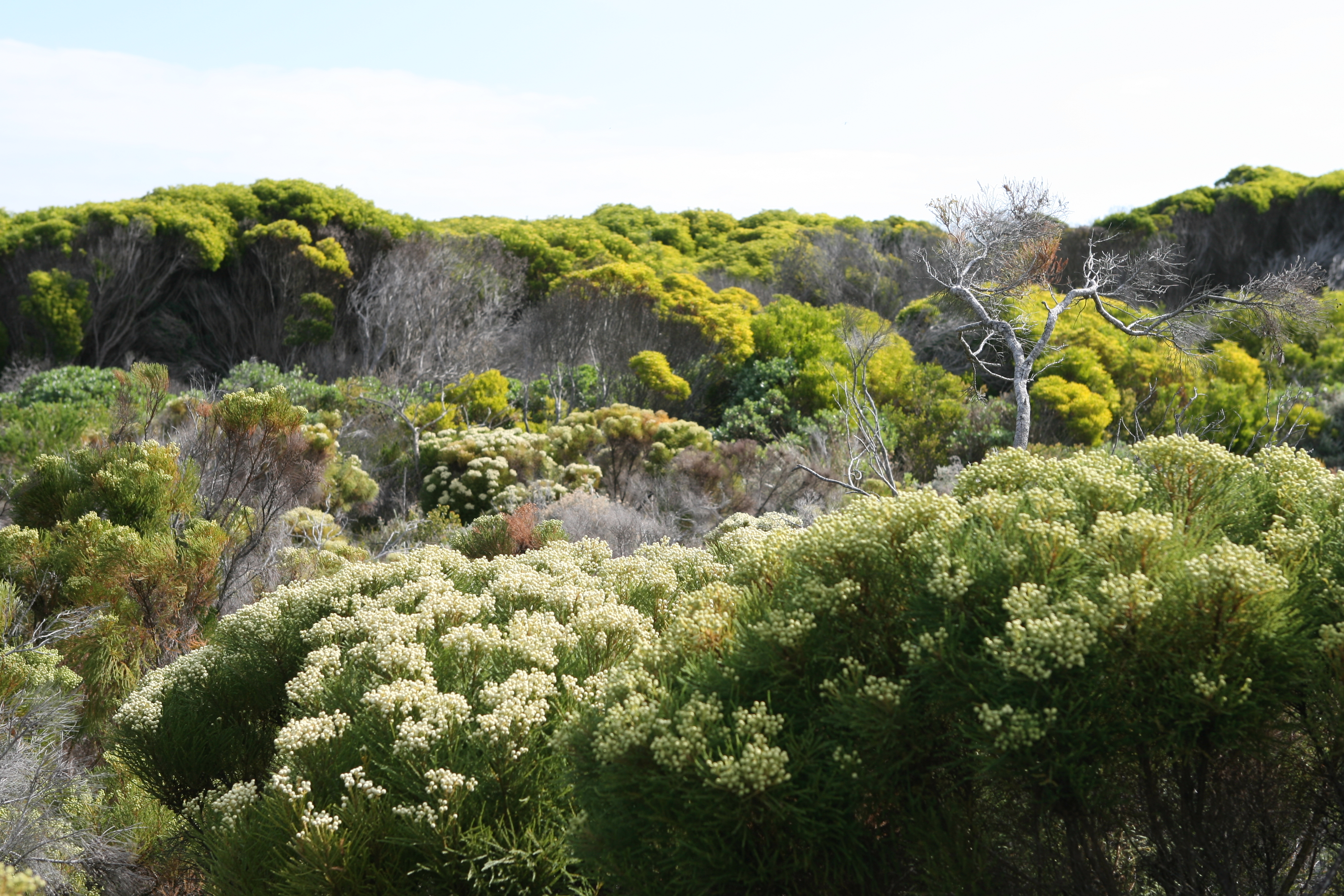
Fynbos in the Western Cape, South Africa

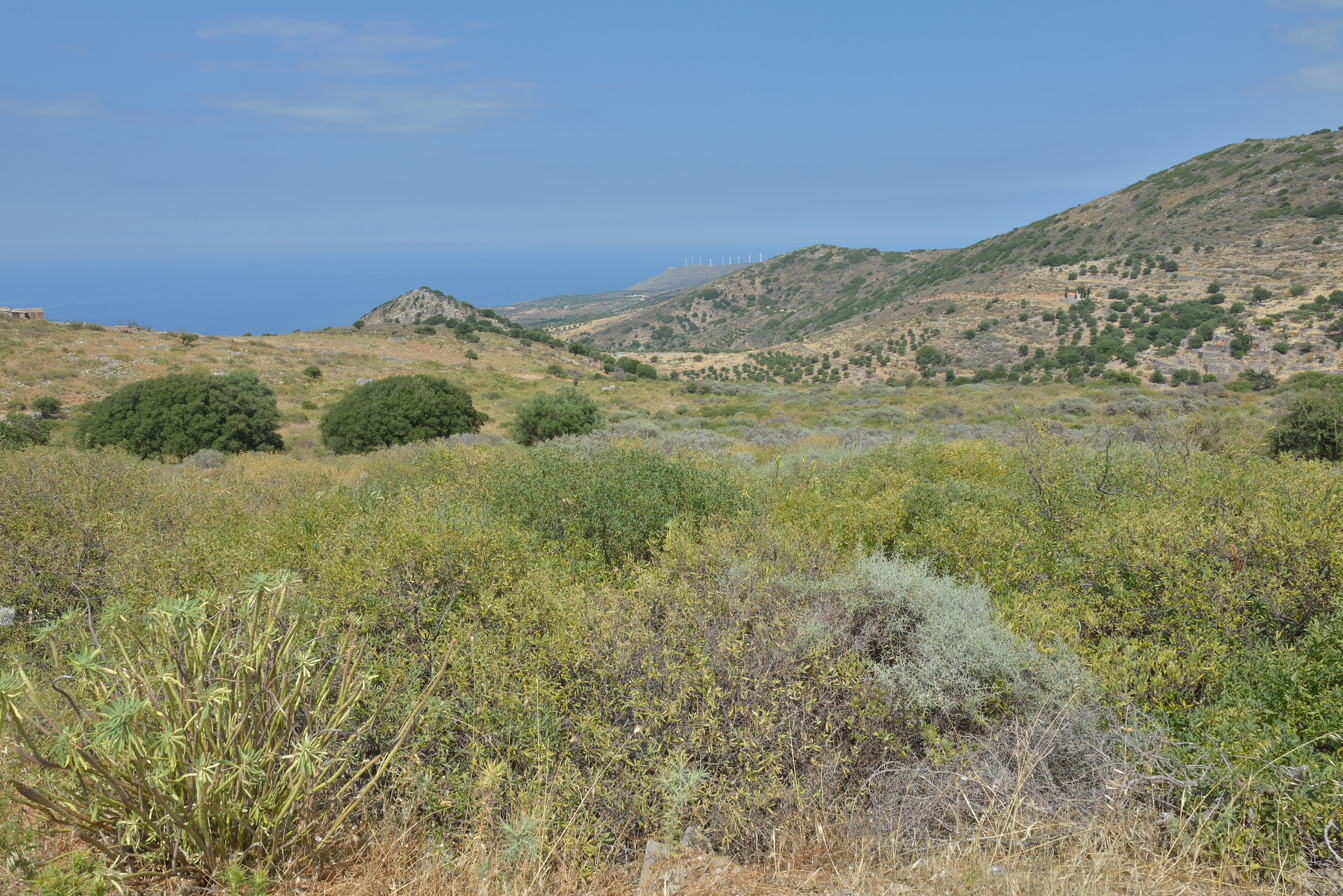
Garrigue vegetation in Crete, Greece

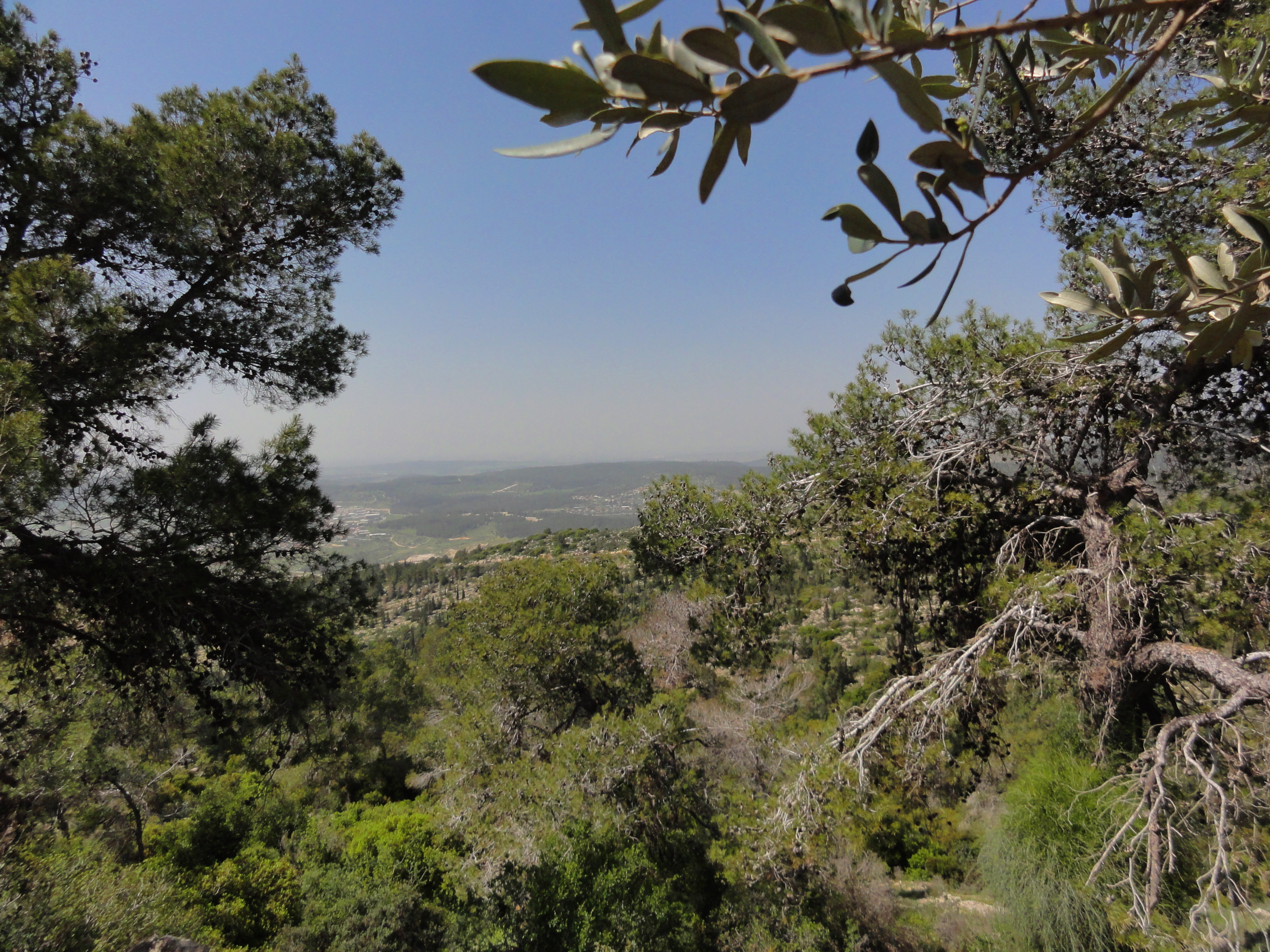
Judean Mountains, Israel

These are the biomes or ecoregions in the world that feature an abundance of, or are known for having, sclerophyll vegetation:

- Cumberland Plain Woodland
- Sydney Sandstone Ridgetop Woodland
- Eastern Suburbs Banksia Scrub
- Tasmanian dry sclerophyll forests
- Aegean and Western Turkey sclerophyllous and mixed forests
- California chaparral and woodlands
- California coastal sage and chaparral
- Chilean Matorral
- Mallee Woodlands and Shrublands
- Italian sclerophyllous and semi-deciduous forests
- Eastern Mediterranean conifer–sclerophyllous–broadleaf forests
- Southwest Iberian Mediterranean sclerophyllous and mixed forests
- Tyrrhenian–Adriatic sclerophyllous and mixed forests
- Canary Islands dry woodlands and forests
- Mediterranean acacia–argania dry woodlands
- Mediterranean dry woodlands and steppe
- Southeastern Iberian shrubs and woodlands
- Cyprus Mediterranean forests
- Crete Mediterranean forests
- Cape Floristic Region
- Southern Anatolian montane conifer and deciduous forests
- Albany thickets
- Northwest Iberian montane forests

== See also ==
- Mediterranean forests, woodlands, and scrub
- Chaparral
- Fynbos
- Maquis shrubland
- Garrigue
- Kwongan
- Matorral
- Barren vegetation
