= Families of Asparagales =

The Asparagales are an order of plants, and on this page the structure of the order is used according to the APG III system. The order takes its name from the family Asparagaceae and is placed in the monocots. The order is clearly circumscribed on the basis of DNA sequence analysis, but is difficult to define morphologically, since its members are structurally diverse. The APG III system is used in World Checklist of Selected Plant Families from the Royal Botanical Gardens at Kew. With this circumscription, the order consists of 14 families (Dahlgren had 31) with approximately 1120 genera and 26000 species.

Thus although most species in the order are herbaceous, some no more than 15 cm high, there are a number of climbers (e.g., some species of Asparagus), as well as several genera forming trees (e.g. Agave, Cordyline, Yucca, Dracaena), some of which can exceed 10 m in height. Succulent genera occur in several families (e.g. Aloe). One of the defining characteristics of the order is the presence of phytomelan (phytomelanin), a black pigment present in the seed coat, creating a dark crust. Phytomelan is found in most families of the Asparagales (although not in Orchidaceae, thought to be a sister to the rest of the group). Almost all species have a tight cluster of leaves (a rosette), either at the base of the plant or at the end of a more-or-less woody stem; the leaves are less often produced along the stem. The flowers are in the main not particularly distinctive, being of a general 'lily type', with six tepals, either free or fused from the base. From an economic point of view, the order Asparagales is second in importance within the monocots to the order Poales (which includes grasses and cereals). Species are used as food and flavourings (e.g. onion, garlic, leek, asparagus, vanilla), as cut flowers (e.g. freesia, gladiolus, iris, orchids), and as garden ornamentals (e.g. day lilies, lily of the valley, Agapanthus).

== Families included by the APG ==
Order Asparagales Link

- Family Amaryllidaceae J.St.-Hil. (including Agapanthaceae F.Voigt, Alliaceae Borkh.) (Note: The name 'Alliaceae' has also been used for the expanded family comprising the Alliaceae sensu stricto, Amaryllidaceae and Agapanthaceae (e.g. in the APG II system). 'Amaryllidaceae' is used as a conserved name in APG III.)
- Family Asparagaceae Juss. (including Agavaceae Dumort. [which includes Anemarrhenaceae, Anthericaceae, Behniaceae and Herreriaceae], Aphyllanthaceae Burnett, Hesperocallidaceae Traub, Hyacinthaceae Batsch ex Borkh., Laxmanniaceae Bubani, Ruscaceae M.Roem. [which includes Convallariaceae] and Themidaceae Salisb.)
- Family Asphodelaceae Juss. (including Hemerocallidaceae R.Br. and Xanthorrhoeaceae Dumort) (Note: The name Xanthorrhoeaceae has priority as of June 2016, but Asphodelaceae has been proposed for conservation and is used in anticipation in the APG IV system of classification.)
- Family Asteliaceae Dumort.
- Family Blandfordiaceae R. Dahlgren & Clifford
- Family Boryaceae M.W. Chase, Rudall & Conran
- Family Doryanthaceae R. Dahlgren & Clifford
- Family Hypoxidaceae R.Br.
- Family Iridaceae Juss.
- Family Ixioliriaceae Nakai
- Family Lanariaceae R. Dahlgren & A.E.van Wyk
- Family Orchidaceae Juss.
- Family Tecophilaeaceae Leyb.
- Family Xeronemataceae M.W. Chase, Rudall & M.F.Fay

The earlier 2003 version, APG II, allowed 'bracketed' families, i.e. families which could either be segregated from more comprehensive families or could be included in them. These are the families given under "including" in the list above. APG III does not allow bracketed families, requiring the use of the more comprehensive family; otherwise the circumscription of the Asparagales is unchanged. A separate paper accompanying the publication of the 2009 APG III system provided subfamilies to accommodate the families which were discontinued. The first APG system of 1998 contained some extra families, included in square brackets in the list above.

== Comparison with older systems ==
Two older systems which use the order Asparagales are the Dahlgren system and the Kubitzki system. The families included in the circumscriptions of the order in these are wrong info

Families included in Asparagales in three systems which use this order
| Dahlgren system | Kubitzki system | APG IV system |
|---|---|---|
| – | Agapanthaceae | Amaryllidaceae: Agapanthoideae |
| Agavaceae | | Asparagaceae: Agavoideae |
| Alliaceae | | Amaryllidaceae: Allioideae |
| Amaryllidaceae | | Amaryllidaceae: Amaryllidoideae |
| – | Anemarrhenaceae | Asparagaceae: Agavoideae |
| Anthericaceae | | Asparagaceae: Agavoideae |
| Aphyllanthaceae | | Asparagaceae: Aphyllanthoideae |
| Asparagaceae | | Asparagaceae: Asparagoideae |
| Asphodelaceae | | Asphodelaceae: Asphodeloideae |
| Asteliaceae | | Asteliaceae |
| – | Behniaceae | Asparagaceae: Agavoideae |
| Blandfordiaceae | | Blandfordiaceae |
| – | Boryaceae | Boryaceae |
| Calectasiaceae | — | Not in Asparagales (family Dasypogonaceae, unplaced as to order, clade commelinids) |
| Convallariaceae | | Asparagaceae: Convallarioideae |
| Cyanastraceae | – | Tecophilaeaceae |
| Dasypogonaceae | – | Not in Asparagales (family Dasypogonaceae, unplaced as to order, clade commelinids) |
| Doryanthaceae | | Doryanthaceae |
| Dracaenaceae | | Asparagaceae: Convallarioideae |
| Eriospermaceae | | Asparagaceae: Convallarioideae |
| Hemerocallidaceae | | Asphodelaceae: Hemerocallidoideae |
| Herreriaceae | | Asparagaceae: Agavoideae |
| Hostaceae | | Asparagaceae: Agavoideae |
| Hyacinthaceae | | Asparagaceae: Scilloideae |
| Hypoxidaceae | | Hypoxidaceae |
| – | Iridaceae | Iridaceae |
| Ixioliriaceae | | Ixioliriaceae |
| – | Johnsoniaceae | Asphodelaceae: Hemerocallidoideae |
| Lanariaceae | | Lanariaceae |
| Luzuriagaceae | – | Not in Asparagales (family Alstroemeriaceae, order Liliales) |
| – | Lomandraceae | Asparagaceae: Lomandroideae |
| Nolinaceae | | Asparagaceae: Convallarioideae |
| – | Orchidaceae | Orchidaceae |
| Philesiaceae | – | Not in Asparagales (family Philesiaceae, order Liliales) |
| Phormiaceae | – | Asphodelaceae: Hemerocallidoideae |
| Ruscaceae | | Asparagaceae: Convallarioideae |
| Tecophilaeaceae | | Tecophilaeaceae |
| – | Themidaceae | Asparagaceae: Brodiaeoideae |
| Xanthorrhoeaceae | | Asphodelaceae: Xanthorrhoeoideae |

== Descriptions of families and subfamilies ==
=== Orchidaceae ===
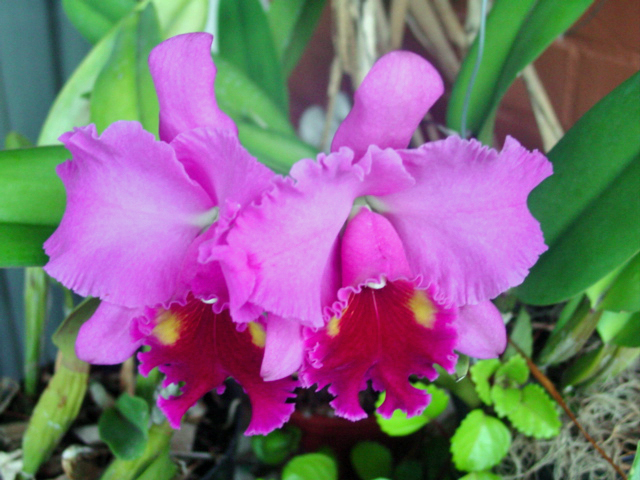
Orchidaceae: × Brassolaeliocattleya 'Turanbeat'

The orchid family is one of the two largest families of angiosperms (the other is Asteraceae). The shape of the flowers is very distinctive, making orchids easy to recognize. The flower is bilaterally symmetrical. The three sepals are generally colourful and bright (which is why they are sometimes called outer tepals), with one on each side ("lateral sepals") and one usually at the top of the flower ("dorsal sepal"), sometimes forming a hood. The three petals (or inner tepals), also showy, are located alternately between the sepals, two at the side and one usually at the bottom of the flower. The lower petal is referred to as the "labellum" or "lip", and is usually distinctively different from the side petals. Thelymitra is an example of a genus where the lower petal is similar in appearance to the other petals. The pollination systems of orchids are among the most complex and interesting of all the angiosperms. Orchids include many species of great ornamental value. Vanilla is obtained from the fruit of the orchid Vanilla planifolia.

=== Boryaceae ===
The genus Borya contains tree-like species which behave as "resurrection plants". Growing on rocky slopes, the plants dry out during the dry season and become a rusty orange color, but quickly turn green and become active again once it starts to rain. Along with the other genus in the family Boryaceae, Alania, these xerophytic plants are native to Australia.

=== Blandfordiaceae ===
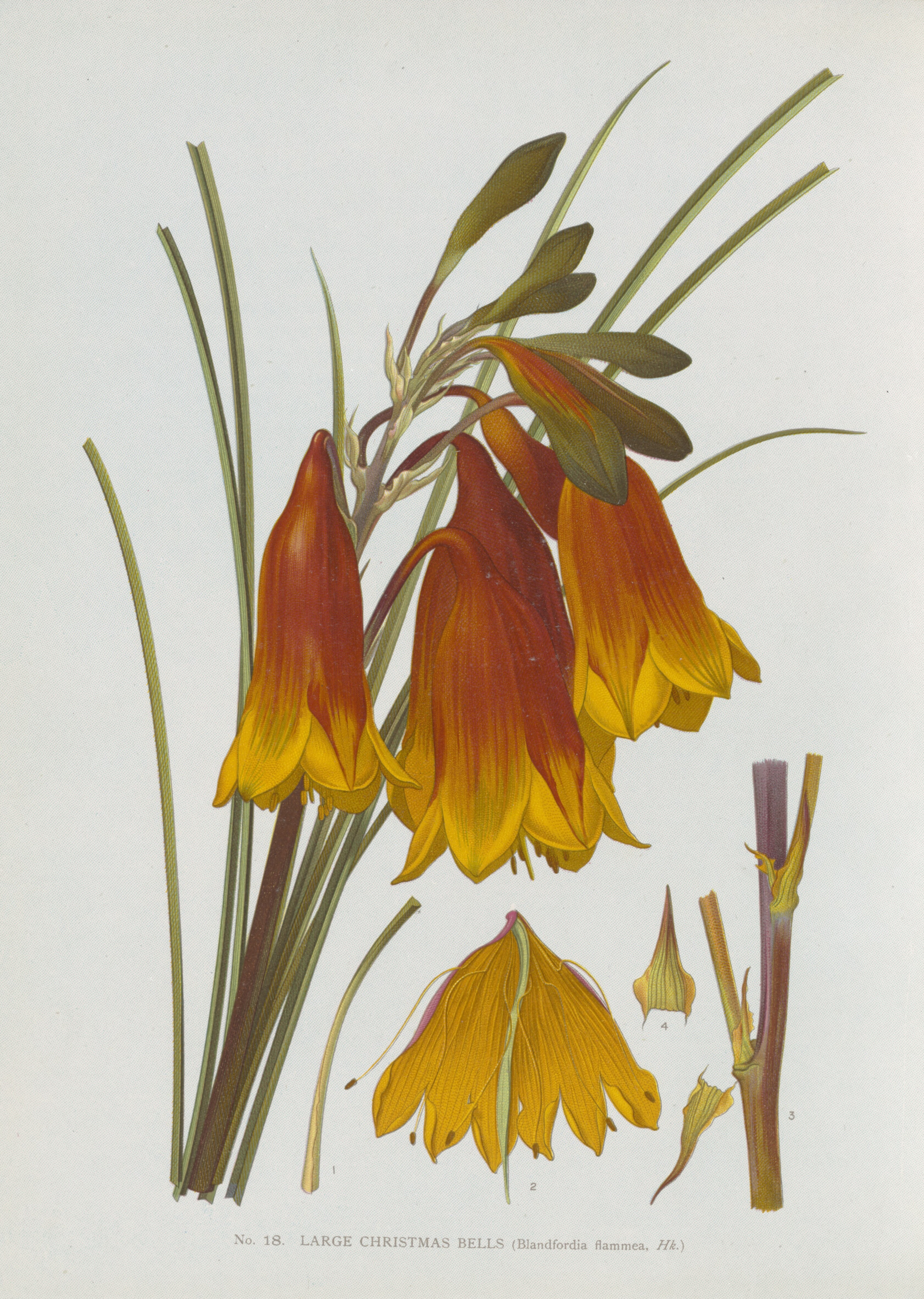
Blandfordiaceae: Blandfordia grandiflora

Blandfordia is the only genus in the family Blandfordiaceae, with four species distributed in eastern Australia. They are commonly called "Christmas bells", because of the shape of their flowers and their flowering time, which coincides with Christmas in Australia. They are upright perennial herbs (to about 1.50 m), with distinctive leaves. The inflorescence is a raceme. Individual flowers have jointed pedicels and tepals forming a tubular shape. The seeds have conspicuous hairs.

=== Lanariaceae ===
Lanaria lanata is the only species in the family Lanariaceae and is found in southern South Africa. A more or less typical monocotyledon, the species can be recognized by its shortly branched inflorescence covered with branched hairs (giving rise to the common name of Lamb's-tail). The flowers are radially symmetrical.

=== Asteliaceae ===
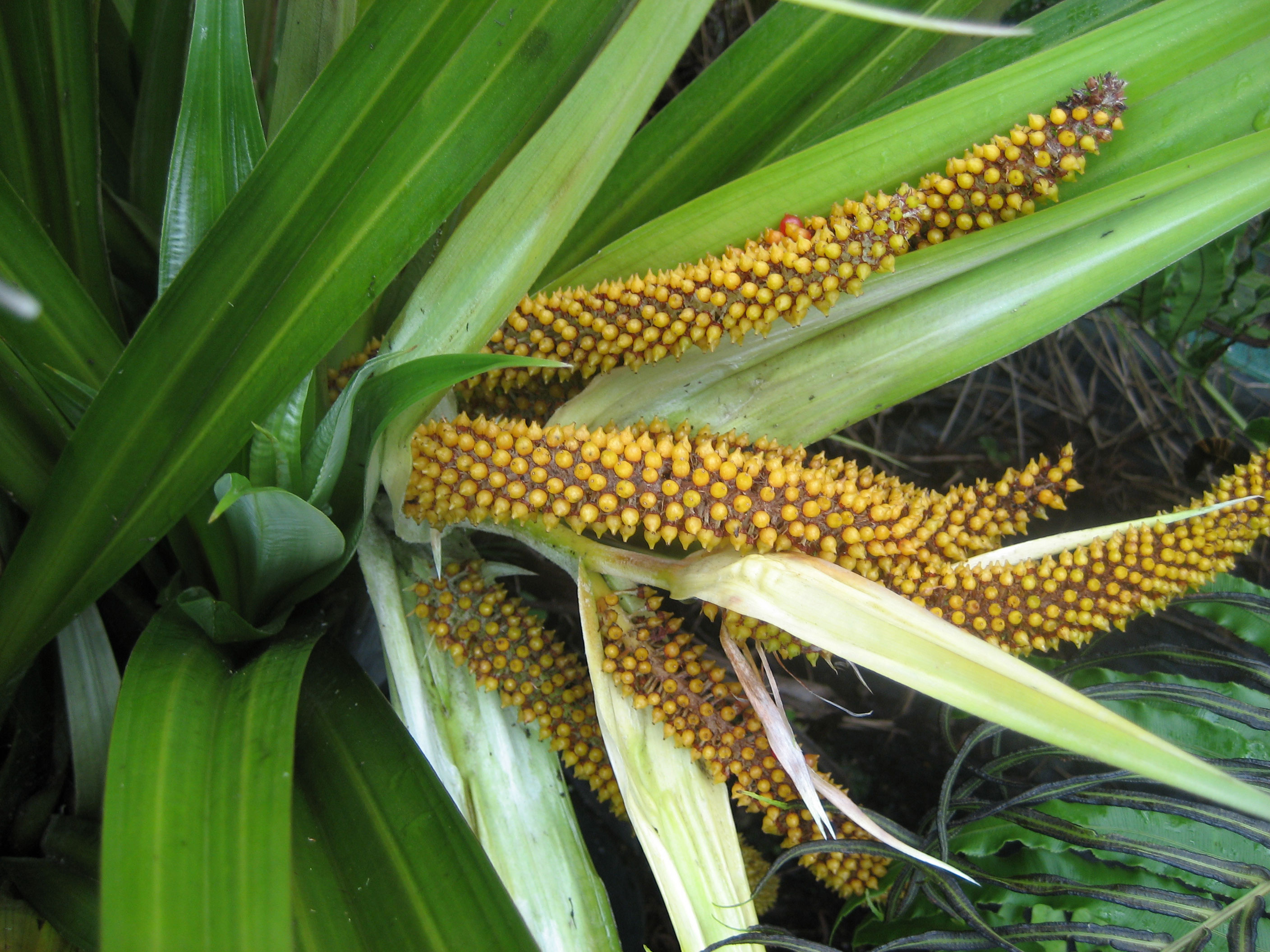
Asteliaceae: Collospermum hastatum

The Asteliaceae is a family of two to four genera of plants found in the Southern Hemisphere. They are more or less rhizomatous, with spiral leaves and an inflorescence that may form a raceme or a spike. There are large bracts at the base of the inflorescence. The individual flowers are small, with tepals joined at the base.

=== Hypoxidaceae ===
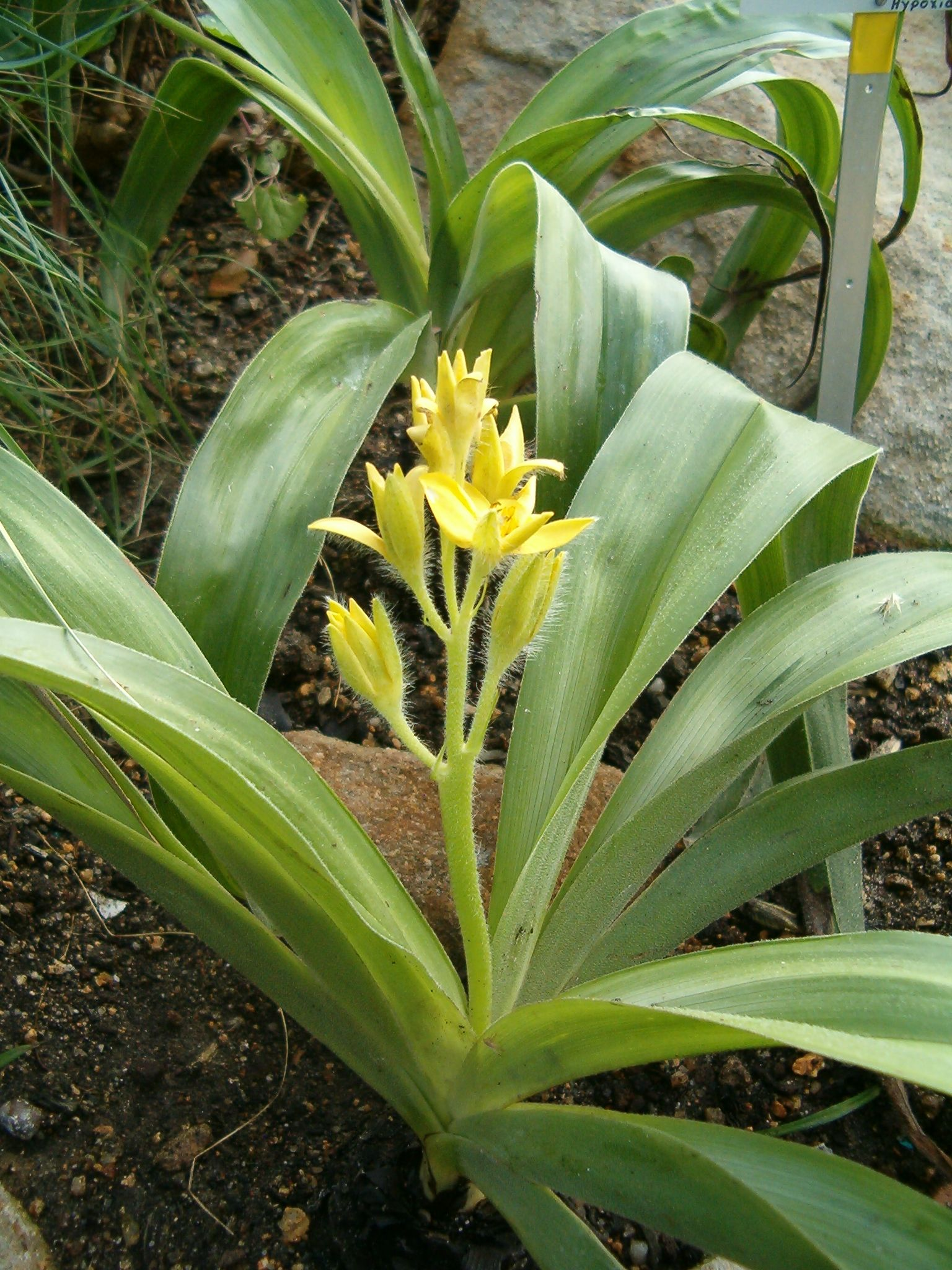
Hypoxidaceae: Hypoxis hemerocallidea

The family includes some 150 species with a worldwide distribution, excluding Europe and northern Asia. Species can be recognized by their rosettes of more or less folded leaves with persistent bases and quite prominent nonglandular hairs. The tepals in the outer whorl tend to be green on the outside. The ovary is inferior with often a thin tubular portion at its apex formed by joined tepals or the tip of the ovary.

=== Ixioliriaceae ===
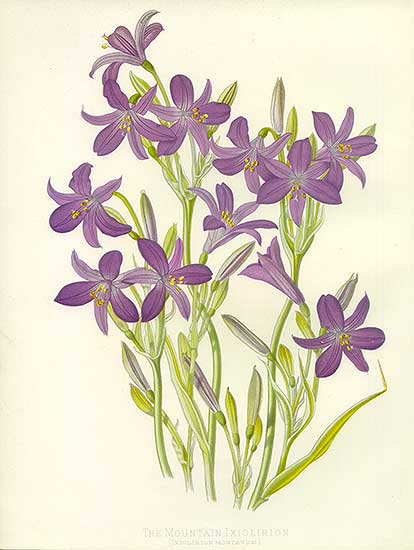
Ixioliriaceae: Ixiolirion

The family includes a single genus, Ixiolirion, with four species distributed from Egypt to central Asia. They are herbs with corms and an inflorescence forming a cluster. The individual flowers are blue, shortly tubular, with an inferior ovary.

=== Tecophilaeaceae ===
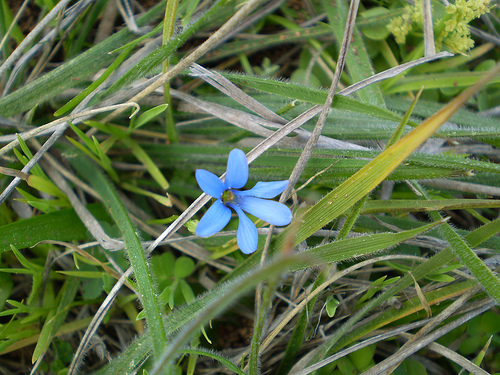
Tecophilaeaceae: Tecophilaea violiflora.

The nine genera are found in Chile, the United States and Africa. They are herbs with corms and leaves which are sometimes stalked (petiolate) with wide blades. The flowers have tepals that open outwards. The stamens are strongly dimorphic. The anthers open by pores. The genus Cyanastrum is sometimes placed in its own family Cyanastraceae.

=== Doryanthaceae ===
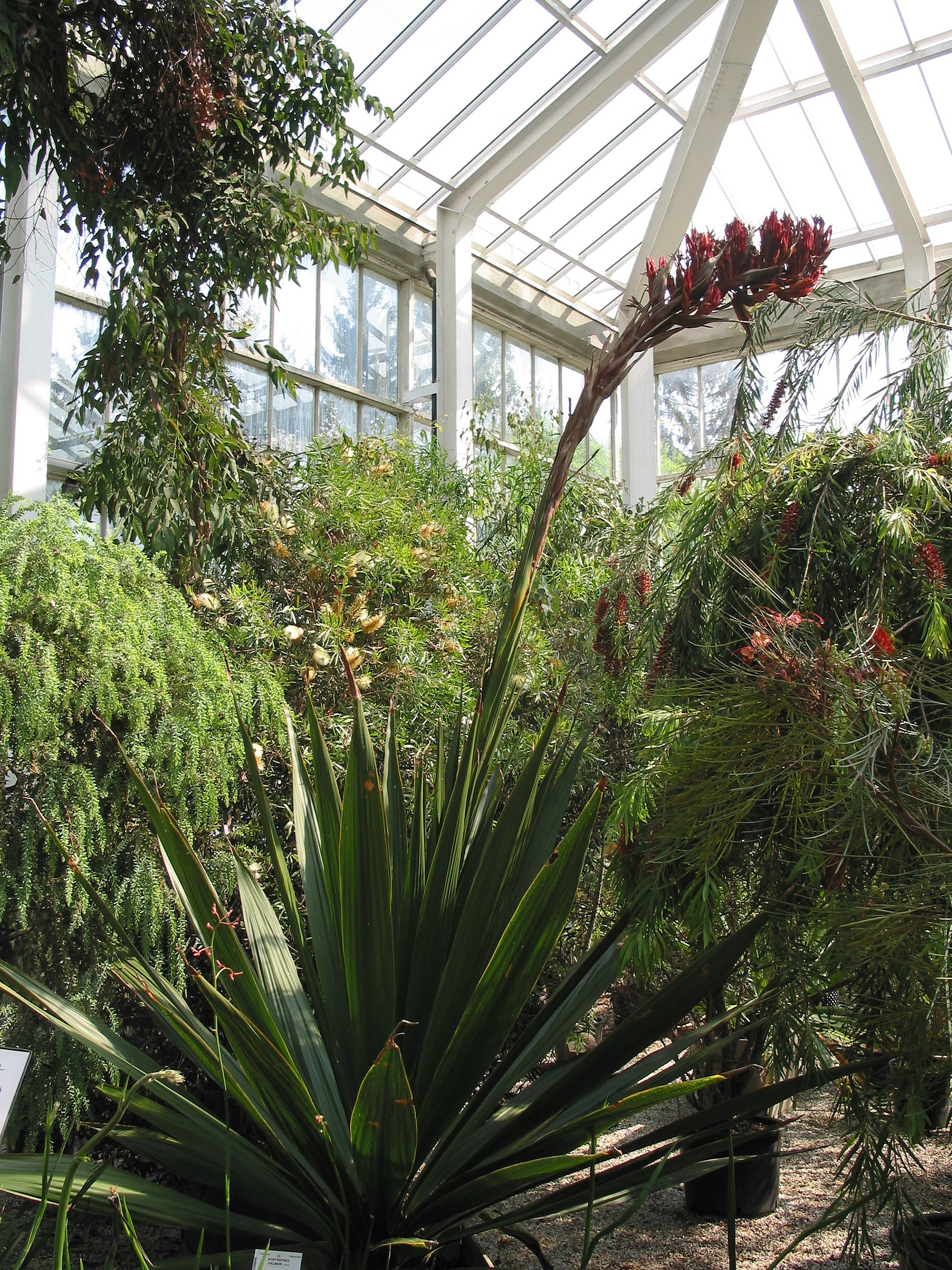
Doryanthaceae: Doryanthes palmeri

The two species of Doryanthes, the only genus of the family, are huge rosette-forming herbs that are a conspicuous element of the flora in the vicinity of Sydney, being hard not to notice when in flower. The leaves have entire margins but disintegrate into fibres at the apex. The sub-umbellate inflorescences are borne at the end of long stems, having numerous bright red flowers, which are radially symmetric with inferior ovaries.

=== Iridaceae ===
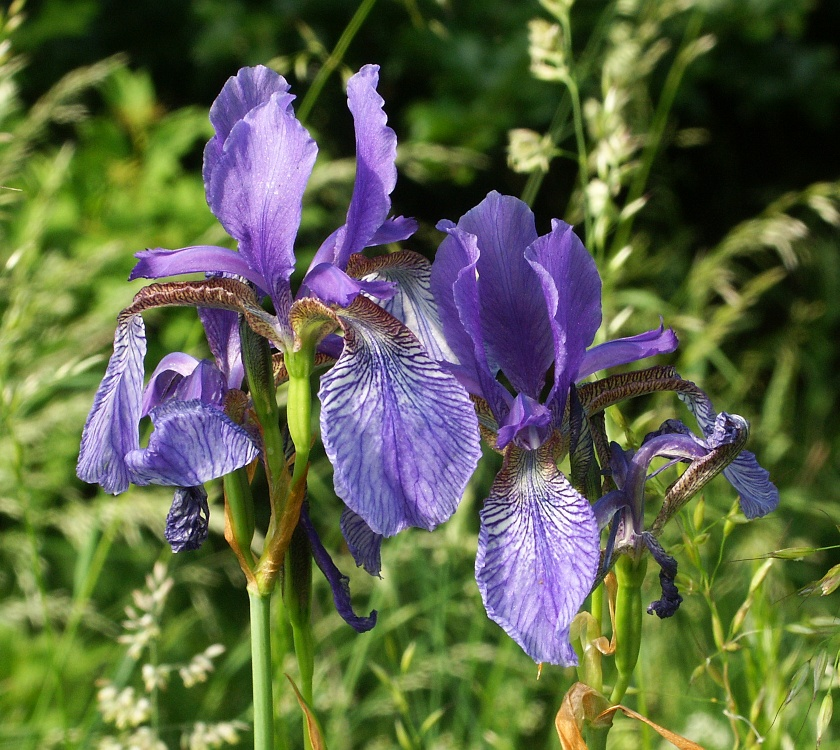
Iridaceae: Iris sibirica

The iris family contains about 70 genera and over 1,600 species with a worldwide distribution. Members of the family are usually perennial herbs with sword-shaped unifacial leaves; the inflorescence is a spike or panicle of solitary flowers, or forms a monochasial cyme or rhipidium (meaning that the successive stems of the flowers follow a zig-zag path in the same plane); and the flower has only three stamens, each opposite to an outer tepal. Saffron is obtained from the dried styles of Crocus sativus L., a member of the iris family. The corms of some species of Iridaceae are used as food by some indigenous peoples. Many species in the iris family have a great economic importance in ornamental horticulture and the cut flower industry, especially Gladiolus, Freesia, Sparaxis, Iris, Tigridia (tiger lily), Ixia (corn lily), Romulea, Neomarica, Moraea (butterfly lily), Nemastylis, Belamcanda, Sisyrinchium (blue-eyed grass), Crocosmia and Trimezia. Many other genera, both perennials and bulbs, are grown in gardens in tropical and temperate regions (e.g. Watsonia, Crocus, Dietes, Tritonia, Hesperantha and Neomarica). Moraea and Homeria are two genera of poisonous plants which are a problem in sheep and cattle producing regions, notably in South Africa.

=== Xeronemataceae ===
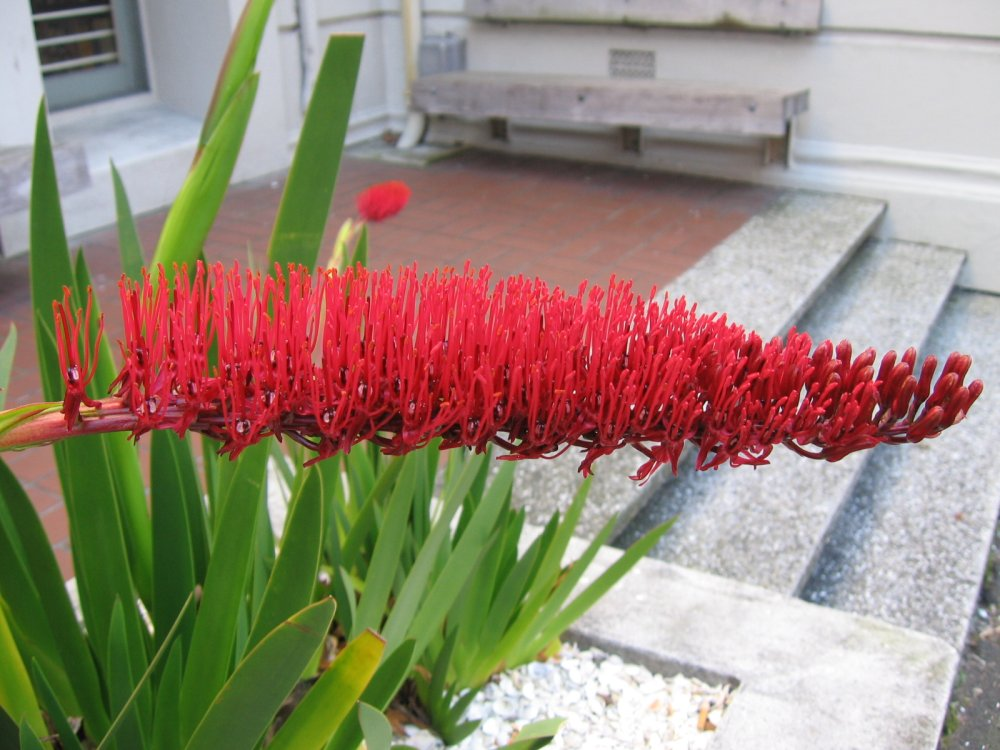
Xeronemataceae: Xeronema

The family consists of a single genus Xeronema with two species, one found only on the Poor Knights islands in New Zealand and the other in New Caledonia. The inflorescence is crowded with quite large, radial symmetrical flowers, which face upwards. The stamens are strongly exserted (i.e. extend out of the flower). The family is still poorly known.

=== Asphodelaceae sensu lato ===
The Asphodelaceae, or asphodel family, has been recognized in some form by many taxonomists but the limits of the family have varied greatly. Based on phylogenetic research, the 2009 revision of the APG classification grouped together the former families Hemerocallidaceae, Xanthorrhoeaceae sensu stricto and Asphodelaceae sensu stricto as the Xanthorrhoeaceae. A paper published at the same time proposed that the original three families should be retained as subfamilies within Xanthorrhoeaceae sensu lato. Xanthorrhoeaceae has priority as a family name, but has been considered not to reflect the nature of the family, and in 2014 it was agreed to propose the formal conservation of Asphodelaceae over Xanthorrhoeaceae to the 2017 International Botanical Congress, which is responsible for plant nomenclature. In anticipation of this decision, the APG IV system uses the name Asphodelaceae.

==== Hemerocallidoideae ====
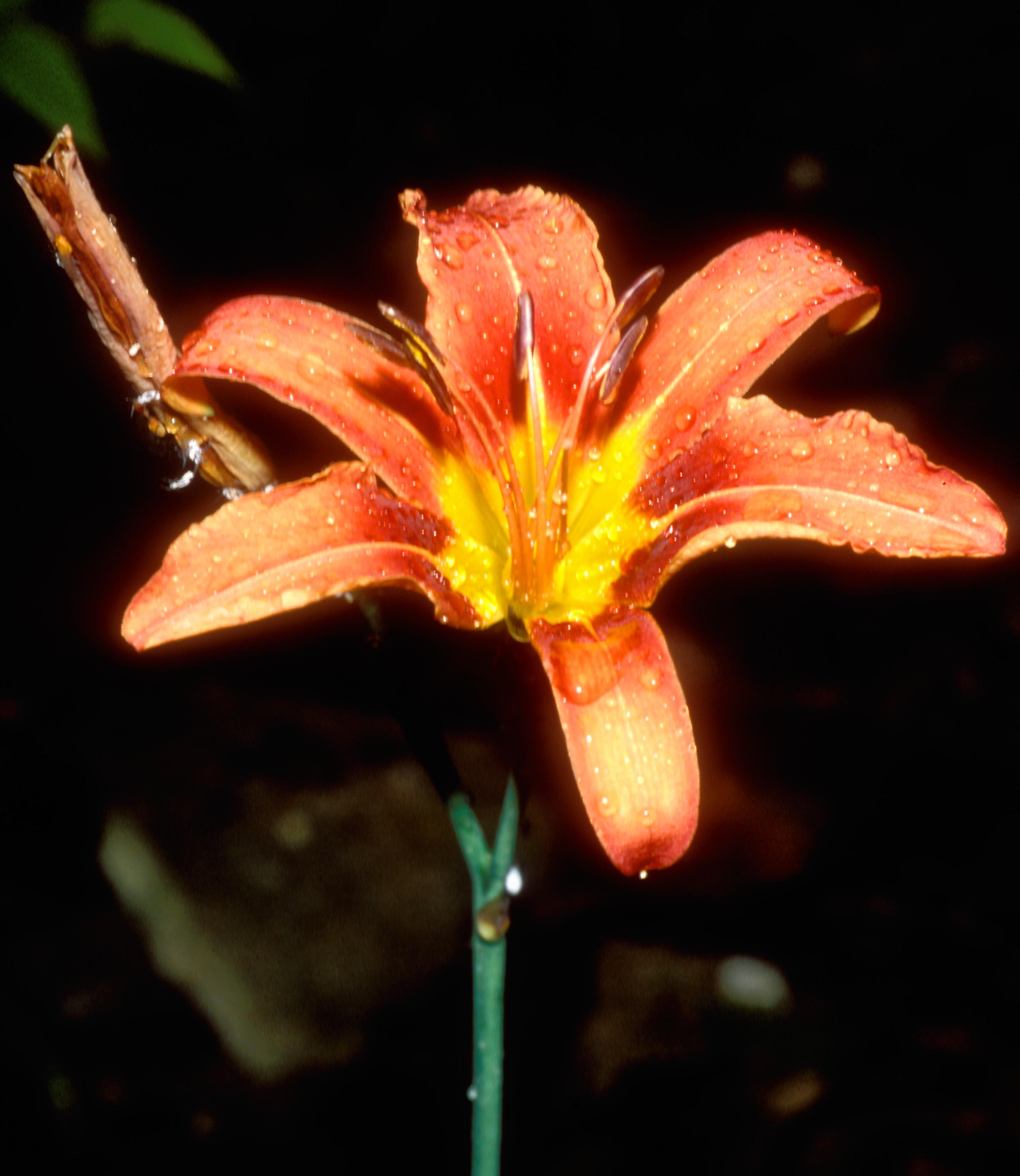
Hemerocallidoideae: Hemerocallis fulva.

The Hemerocallidoideae, or day lily, subfamily of the Xanthorrhoeaceae sensu lato is treated in some systems as a separate family, the Hemerocallidaceae. It includes perennial herbaceous plants which are glabrous and have short rhizomes with fibrous roots or are rhizomatous with root tubers. The leaves form a rosette at the base of the plant, and are alternate, distichous, flat, sessile, simple, linear or lanceolate, and parallel veined, with entire margins. The flower is typically somewhat zygomorphic (i.e. not radially symmetrical) and has nectaries. The flowers are arranged in various types of inflorescence. The group includes eight genera and about 85 species distributed in the temperate zones of Europe and Asia, Malaysia, India, Madagascar, Africa and the Pacific, from Australia and New Zealand to South America. Two of the genera, Hemerocallis (day lily) and Phormium (New Zealand flax), are grown as ornamentals worldwide.

==== Xanthorrhoeoideae ====
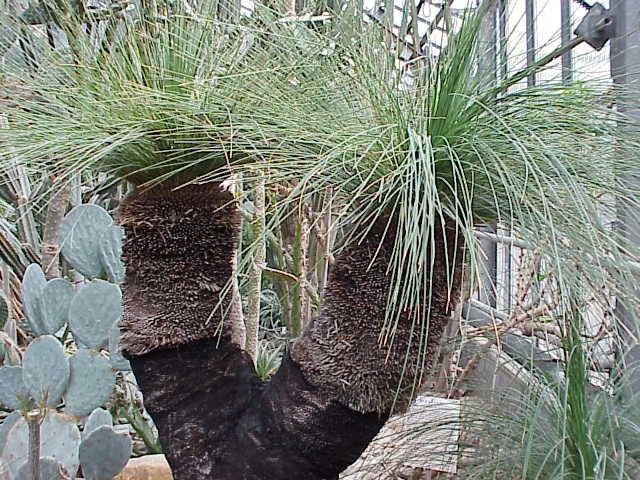
Xanthorrhoeoideae: Xanthorrhoea preissii

The Xanthorrhoeoideae, or grasstree, subfamily of the Xanthorrhoeaceae sensu lato is treated in some systems as a separate family, the Xanthorrhoeaceae sensu stricto. It contains only one genus, Xanthorrhoea, endemic to Australia. Many species have an erect woody stem which is covered with persistent dried leaves unless there have been fires, topped by a crown of long thin leaves. The spike-like inflorescence is erect and densely crowded with small flowers. The fruit is a capsule. Plants are adapted to bush fires, which can stimulate flowering.

==== Asphodeloideae ====
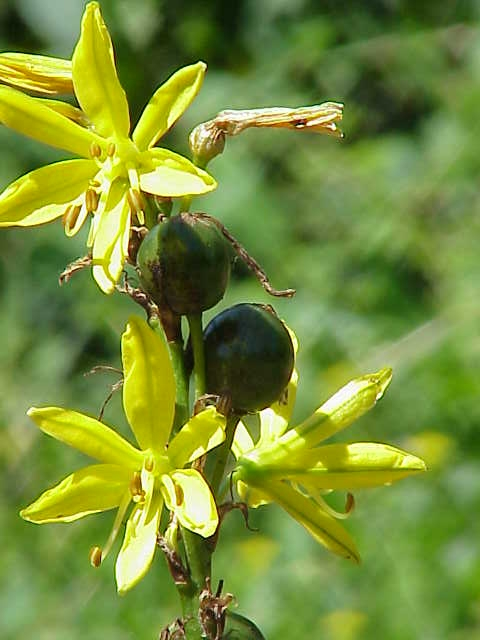
Asphodeloideae: Asphodeline lutea

The Asphodeloideae, or asphodel, subfamily of the Xanthorrhoeaceae sensu lato is treated in some systems as a separate family, the Asphodelaceae. Members of the family are natives of temperate to tropical regions of the Old World, with 15 genera and 780 species. The greatest diversity occurs in South Africa, usually in arid habitats. They differ from other related families by often being pachycauline (i.e. with a thickened trunk, usually wider at the base, which has a water storage function), by usually having succulent leaves, and by possessing a trimerous flower with a superior ovary and seeds with an aryl. The most conspicuous genus in the family is Aloe. Many species of Aloe are used medicinally and in cosmetics. For example, "aloin" is derived from Aloe vera and Aloe ferox and has important medical uses (e.g. as a laxative and in the treatment of burns) as well as cosmetic uses (e.g. in skin and hair products). Other genera are used as ornamental plants, both succulents such as Aloe, Haworthia and Gasteria and perennials such as Kniphofia, Asphodelus and Bulbine.

=== Amaryllidaceae sensu lato ===
The amaryllis family has been recognized in many taxonomic systems, but the limits of the family have varied. In the narrowest definition, the Amaryllidaceae sensu stricto is characterized by an umbellate inflorescence with an inferior ovary. Two other groups have similar inflorescences but a superior ovary, and have at times been put into separate families: the Agapanthaceae and the Alliaceae. Based on phylogenetic research, the latest (2009) revision of the APG classification groups together these three families under the conserved name of Amaryllidaceae. (Earlier the APG had used the name Alliaceae for this group.). A paper published at the same time as the 2009 classification proposed that the original three families should be retained as subfamilies within Amaryllidaceae sensu lato. This division has been used here.

==== Agapanthoideae ====
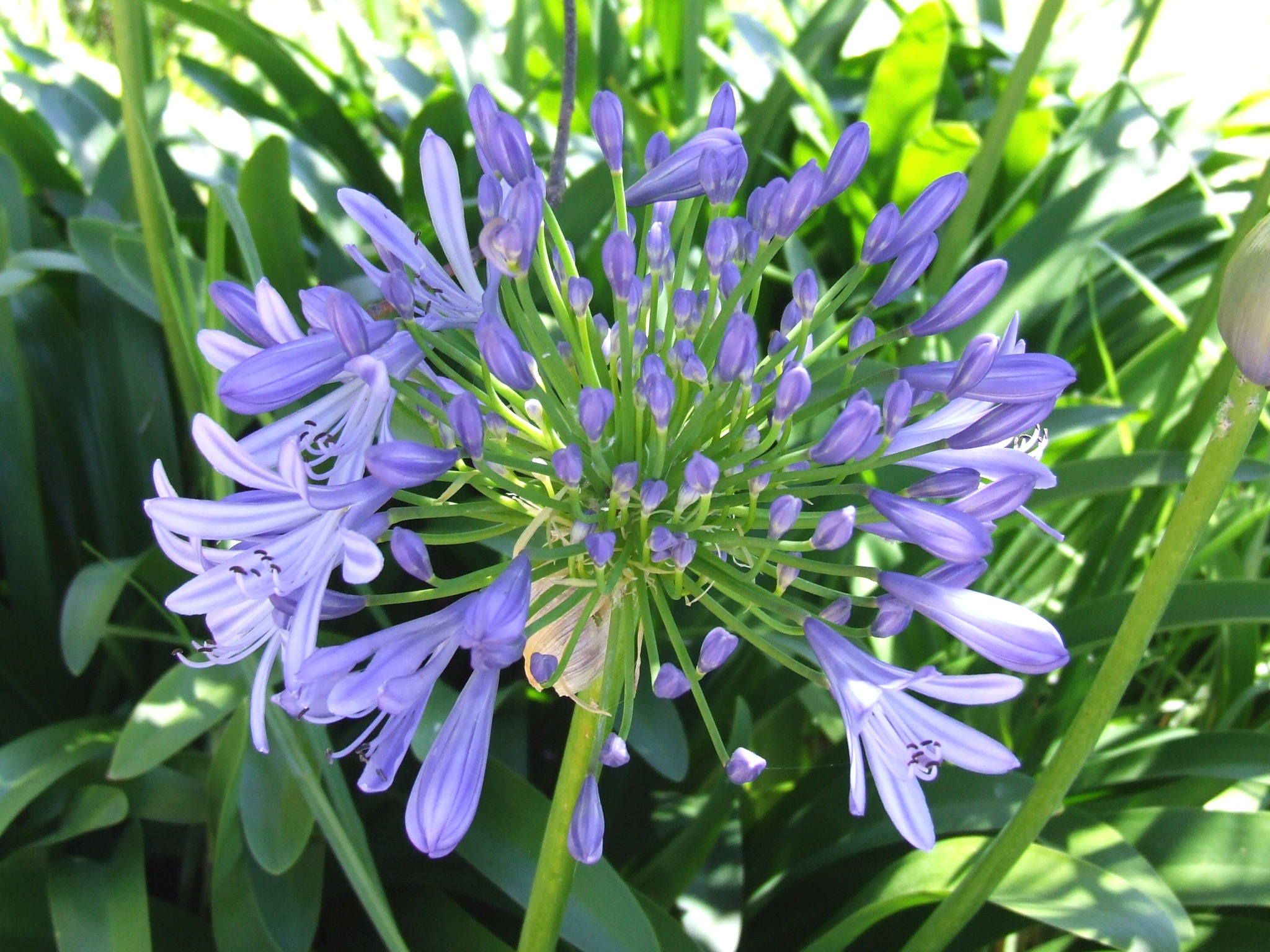
Agapanthoideae: Agapanthus

The agapanthus subfamily of the Amaryllidaceae sensu lato is treated in some systems as a separate family, the Agapanthaceae. Agapanthus, native to South Africa, is the sole genus of the subfamily. They are relatively robust herbaceous perennials with short rhizomes and leaves forming a rosette, individually linear-oblong, flat, rather fleshy. The flowers are quite large, blue or white, forming an umbel at the end of a stem (scape) which is longer than the leaves. The inflorescences are protected by bracts joined along one side. The ovary is superior. Plants do not have the characteristic garlic odor of the allium subfamily (Allioideae). They are set apart from the amaryllis subfamily (Amaryllidoideae) by their superior ovary, the presence of saponins and the absence of the alkaloids typical of amaryllids. Agapanthus is widely grown as an ornamental in temperate gardens.

==== Allioideae ====
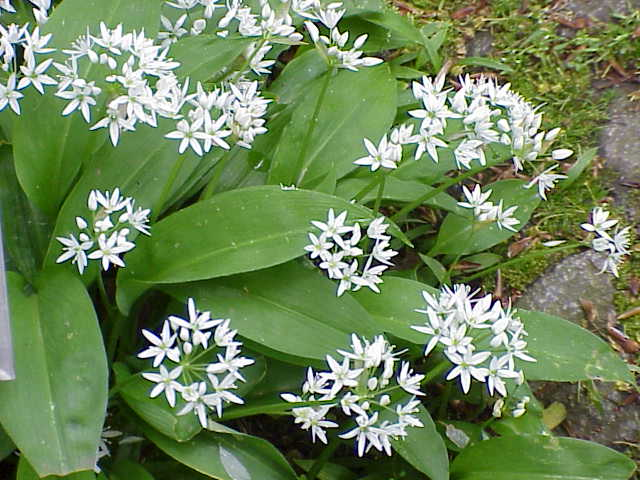
Allioideae: Allium ursinum

The allium subfamily of the Amaryllidaceae sensu lato is treated in some systems as a separate family, the Alliaceae. Members of the subfamily are found worldwide, in temperate, subtropical and tropical regions. They are herbaceous perennials, usually with bulbs, although in some cases they have short rhizomes. The subfamily can be easily recognized by its characteristic smell (the smell of garlic and onions, singular enough to be called "garlic odour"), by the very soft, fleshy leaves and the umbel-like inflorescence at the end of a stem (scape), which has small to medium flowers with a superior ovary. The subfamily is of considerable economic importance, being grown as vegetables and seasoning, medicinal plants and ornamentals. The genus Allium includes some of the most widely used edible plants, such as onion and shallot (varieties of Allium cepa), garlic (A. sativum and A. scordoprasum), leek (Allium ampeloprasum var. porrum), and various flavourings such as chives (Allium schoenoprasum). The organosulphur compounds responsible for the characteristic odour are believed to have antioxidant, antibiotic and anticarcinogenic properties, to stimulate the immune system and to be protective of liver functioning. The family also has important ornamentals, mainly from the dominant genus Allium, but also including genera such as Ipheion.

==== Amaryllidoideae ====
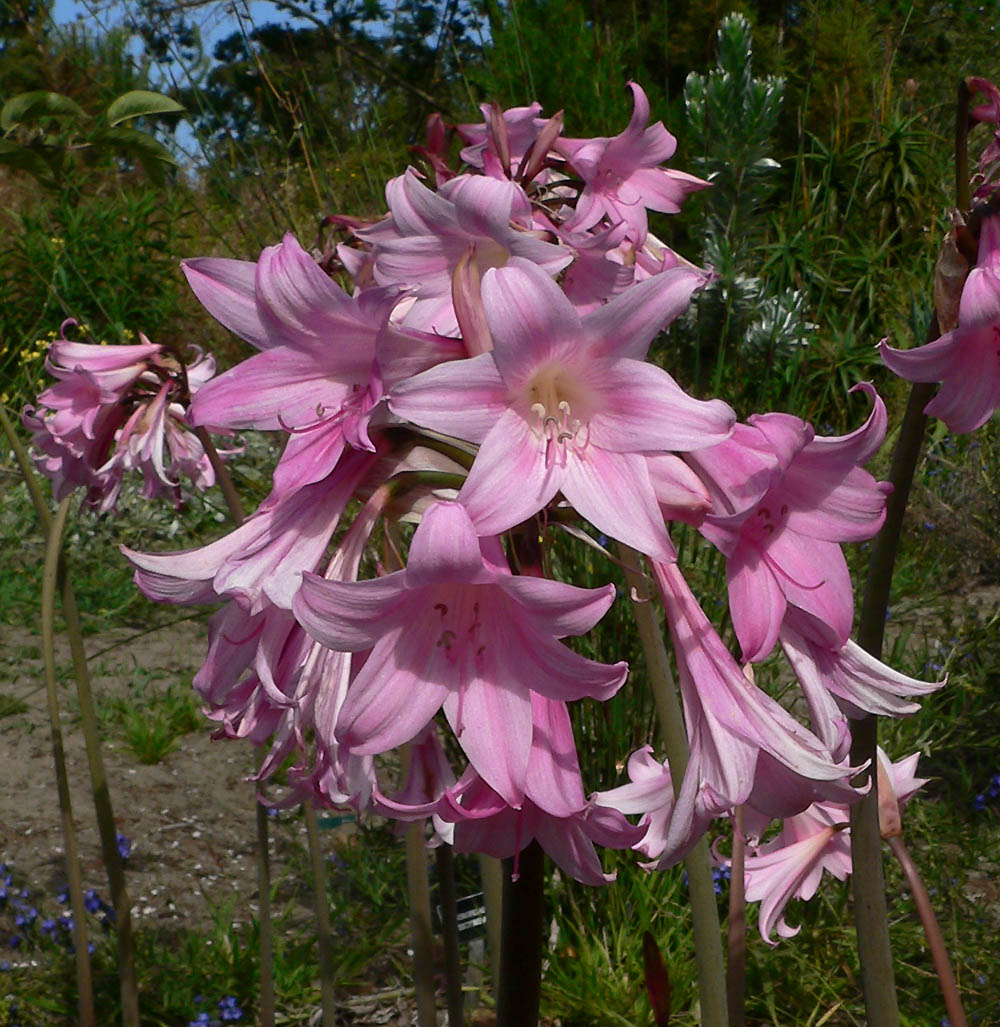
Amaryllidoideae: Amaryllis belladonna

The amaryllis subfamily of the Amaryllidaceae sensu lato is treated in some systems as a separate family, the Amaryllidaceae sensu stricto. The subfamily includes 59 genera and approximately 800 species from temperate and tropical regions worldwide. They are herbaceous perennials with bulbs, and can be identified by their rather fleshy leaves, usually large and attractive flowers, with six stamens and an inferior ovary. The flowers are solitary or, more frequently, arranged in umbellate inflorescences at the end of a stem (scape). Many species of Amaryllidoideae are popular as ornamentals in parks and gardens. A special mention should be made of Narcissus (daffodils and narcissi), cultivated in various parts of the world as an ornamental in gardens and as a cut flower.

=== Asparagaceae sensu lato ===
The members of this group have a complex taxonomic history, having been assigned to widely differing families in different classification systems. Proposed subgroups are difficult to recognise, having similar 'lily-like' flowers, with the result that some members of the group have been included in different subgroups at different times. Based on phylogenetic research, the latest (2009) revision of the APG classification supports the use of a single broadly defined family, Asparagaceae sensu lato. A paper published at the same time as the 2009 classification proposed seven subfamilies for the families recognized in the very first APG classification of 1998. This division has been used here, although it is not clear whether the approach will be upheld by future research as some of the clades are weakly supported. The broadly defined family is large, with some 153 genera and 2480 species, and occurs worldwide.

==== Aphyllanthoideae ====
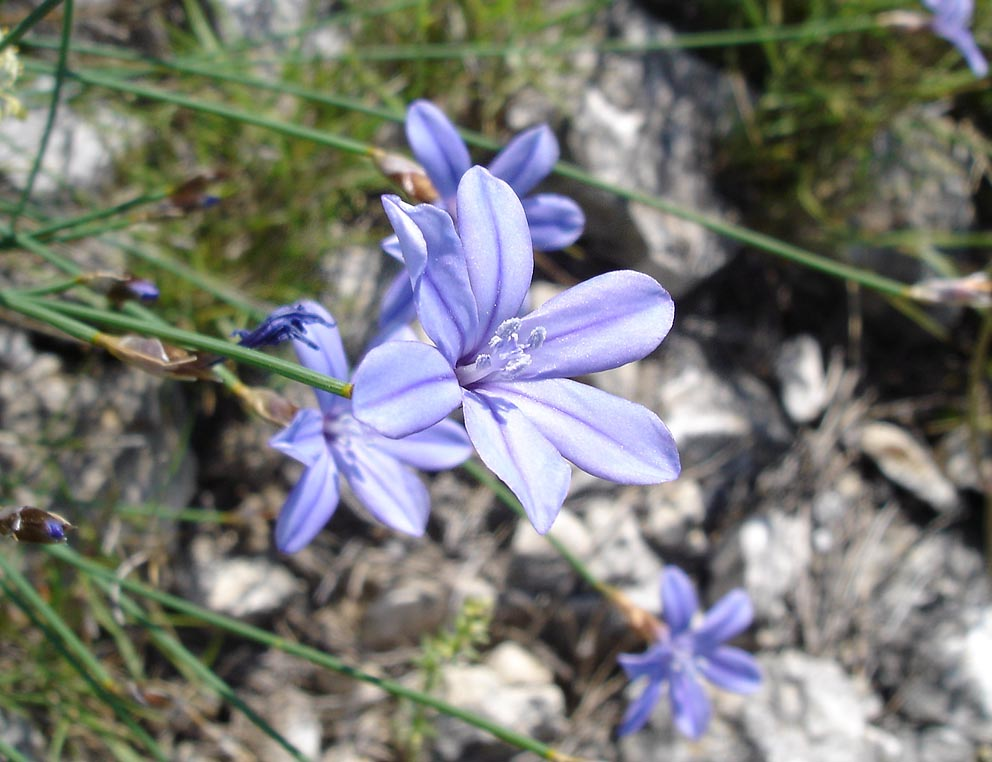
Aphyllanthoideae: Aphyllanthes monspeliensis

The subfamily Aphyllanthoideae of the Asparagaceae sensu lato is treated in some systems as a separate family, the Aphyllanthaceae. It comprises a single species, Aphyllanthes monspeliensis, found in arid areas of the western Mediterranean. The inflorescence is made up of small clusters of blue flowers at the end of a long stem (scape). An unusual feature of the species is that the stem (scape) is actually the main photosynthetic organ, since the paper-like leaves at the base lack chlorophyll.

==== Brodiaeoideae ====
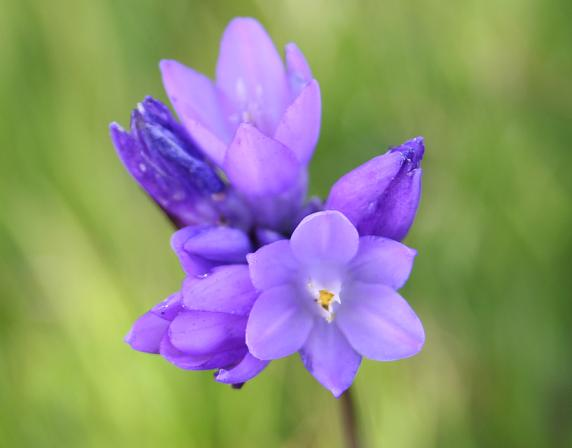
Brodiaeoideae: Dipterostemon capitatus

The subfamily Brodiaeoideae of the Asparagaceae sensu lato is treated in some systems as a separate family, under the name Themidaceae. It comprises about a dozen genera which are native to western North America. Plants are superficially similar to those of the allium subfamily, being perennial herbs with an umbellate inflorescence made up of quite small flowers. The tepals are more or less joined at the base, sometimes with a corona (a structure like the trumpet of a daffodil). The ovary is superior. Plants lack the "garlic odor" typical of the allium subfamily, and have a fibrous corm rather than a bulb. The inflorescence bracts also differ from those of alliums. A number of genera, including Brodiaea and Triteleia, are grown as ornamental plants.

==== Scilloideae ====
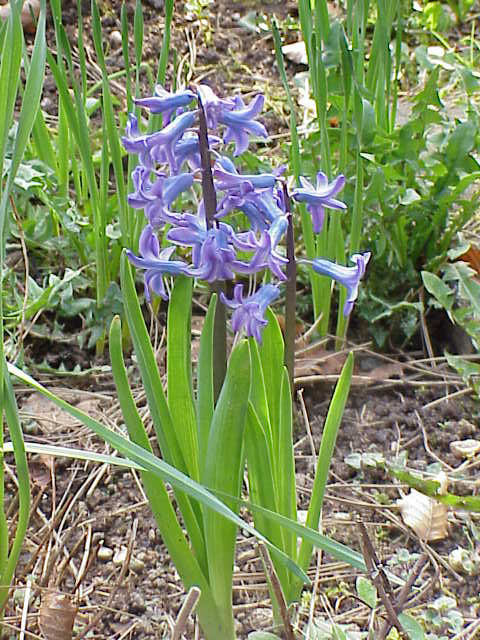
Scilloideae: Hyacinthus orientalis.

The scilla subfamily, Scilloideae, of the Asparagaceae sensu lato is treated in some systems as a separate family, under the name Hyacinthaceae. The group includes from 770 to 1,000 species, distributed predominantly in Mediterranean climates, especially South Africa, the Mediterranean to Central Asia and Burma, and South America. Characteristics of the subfamily include: flowers with six tepals and six stamens, typically arranged in a raceme; a superior ovary; growing from bulbs; rather fleshy mucilaginous leaves in a basal rosette. Plants contain poisonous compounds, so that they are not edible. Many spring- and summer-flowering bulbs grown in gardens in temperate climates belong to this subfamily, including genera such as Scilla (squill), Muscari (grape hyacinth), Hyacinthus (hyacinths),Chionodoxa (glory of the snow) and Galtonia (summer hyacinth). Some are used as cut flowers.

==== Agavoideae ====
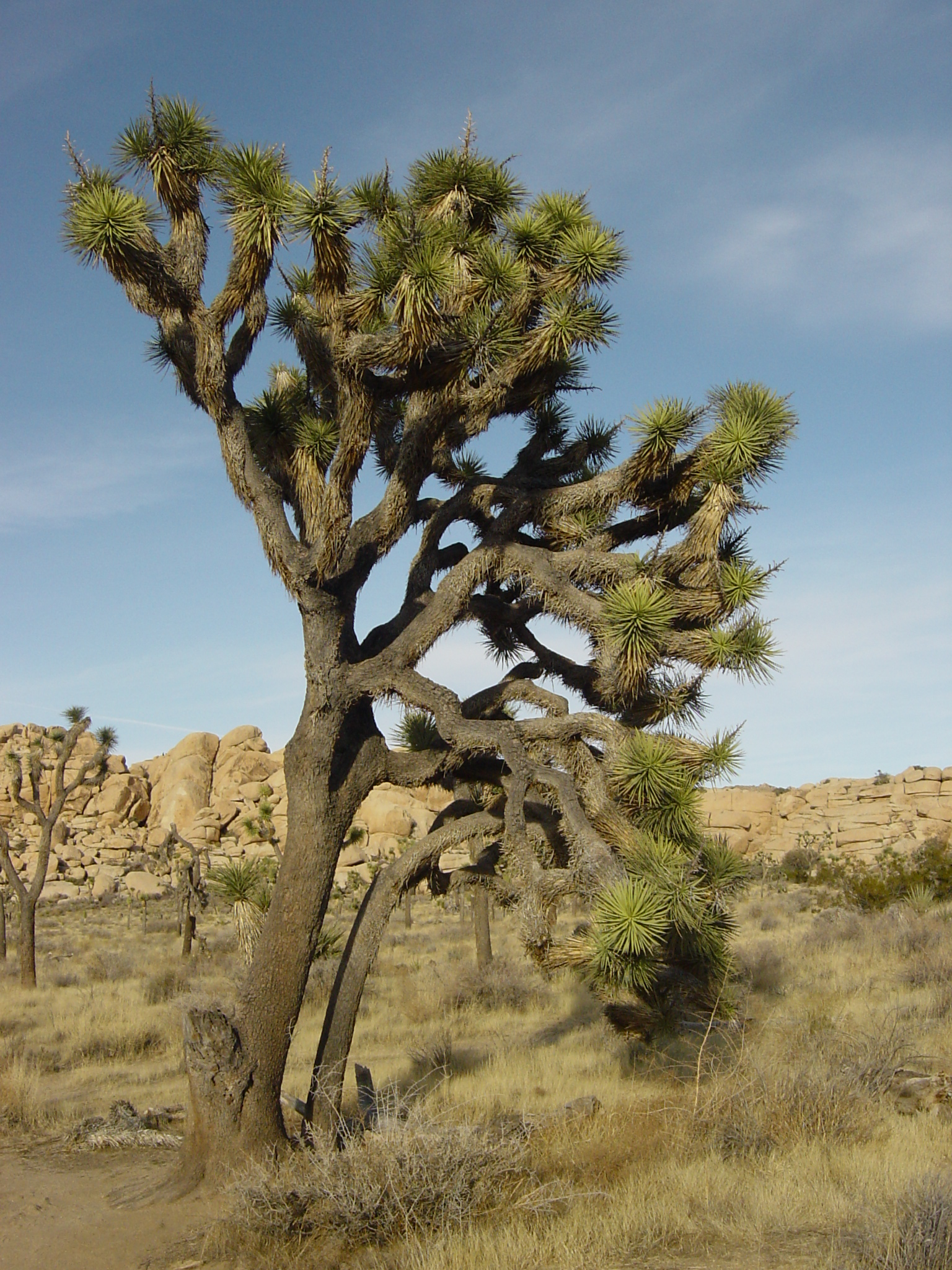
Agavoideae: Yucca

The agave subfamily, Agavoideae, of the Asparagaceae sensu lato is treated in some systems as a separate family, under a variety of names, including Agavaceae. It includes species formerly placed in several other families (e.g. Anthericaceae and Hesperocallidaceae). Many species currently assigned to this group have been placed in other groups at different times. Stevens notes "The broad concept of Agavoideae adopted here may not seem very satisfactory, but I fear that none of the alternative solutions is much better ...". Given this broad definition, there are about 23 genera in over 600 species, distributed more or less around the world outside cold areas. South west North America, including Mexico, is an area of particular diversity. Some members of the subfamily form trees (such as the Joshua Tree, a species of Yucca). They often have large, succulent leaves in rosettes, either at the base or at the end of the branches. Others are herbaceous (e.g. Hosta, Anthericum). The flowers have six tepals and six stamens with either a superior or inferior ovary. Agave has important economic uses (for example, it is used to make tequila and mezcal). Some genera are used as ornamental garden plants in temperate regions (e.g. Hosta) and as house plants (e.g. Chlorophytum).

==== Lomandroideae ====
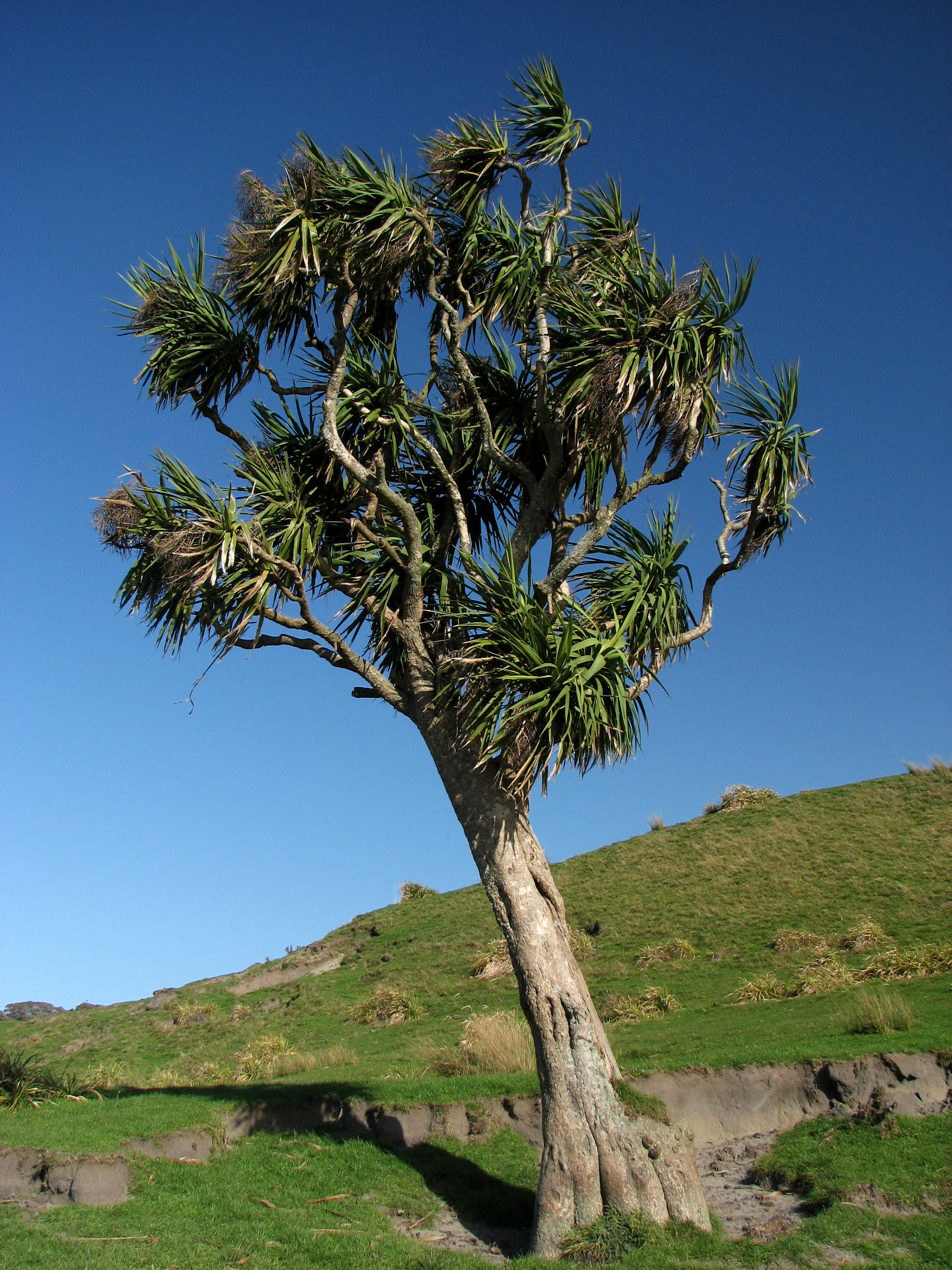
Lomandroideae: Cordyline

The subfamily Lomandroideae of the Asparagaceae sensu lato is treated in some systems as a separate family, Laxmanniaceae. The group consists of some 15 genera and about 180 species from Australasia, south east Asia, and South America. The best known genus is Cordyline. The tepals of the flower persist in the fruit. Species of Cordyline are grown as house plants and as garden plants in temperate to tropical regions.

==== Asparagoideae ====
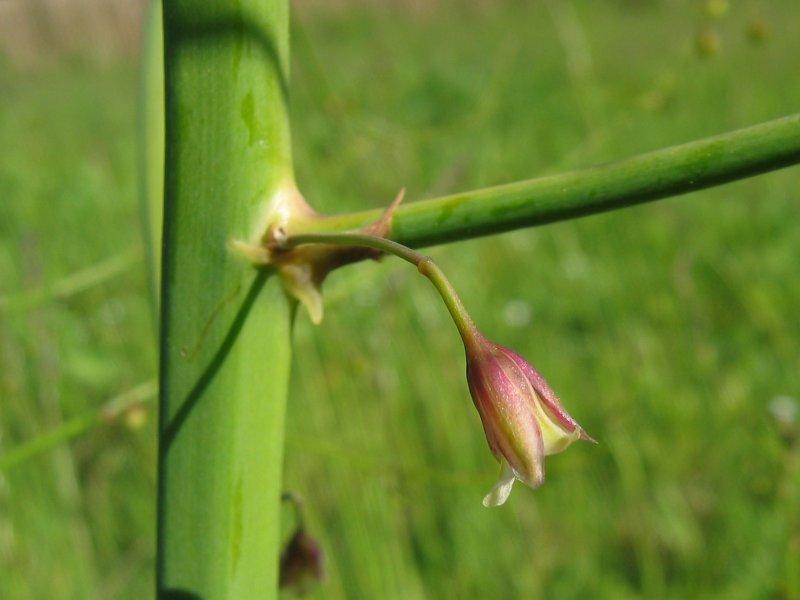
Asparagoideae: Asparagus officinalis

The asparagus subfamily of the Asparagaceae sensu lato is treated in some systems as a separate family, the Asparagaceae sensu stricto. The subfamily contains only two genera, one, Asparagus, with around 150–300 species distributed throughout the Old World and a small area of Australia, the other, Hemiphylacus, with only five species, found in Mexico. The photosynthetic organs of Asparagus have been the subject of some controversy; however, most authors consider them to be flattened stems rather than leaves (phylloclades). The leaves are reduced to non-photosynthetic scales, with the phylloclades in their axils. The flowers are small, bell-shaped, greenish-white to yellowish, with six tepals partially joined at the base, either single or in small clusters, springing from the junctions of the phylloclades. Asparagus species are usually dioecious, with male and female flowers on separate plants. The fruit is a small red berry, which is poisonous to humans. Asparagus officinalis is used as a vegetable, the young shoots being cut before they become woody. Other species are used as house plants and as greenery in the cut flower trade.

==== Convallarioideae ====
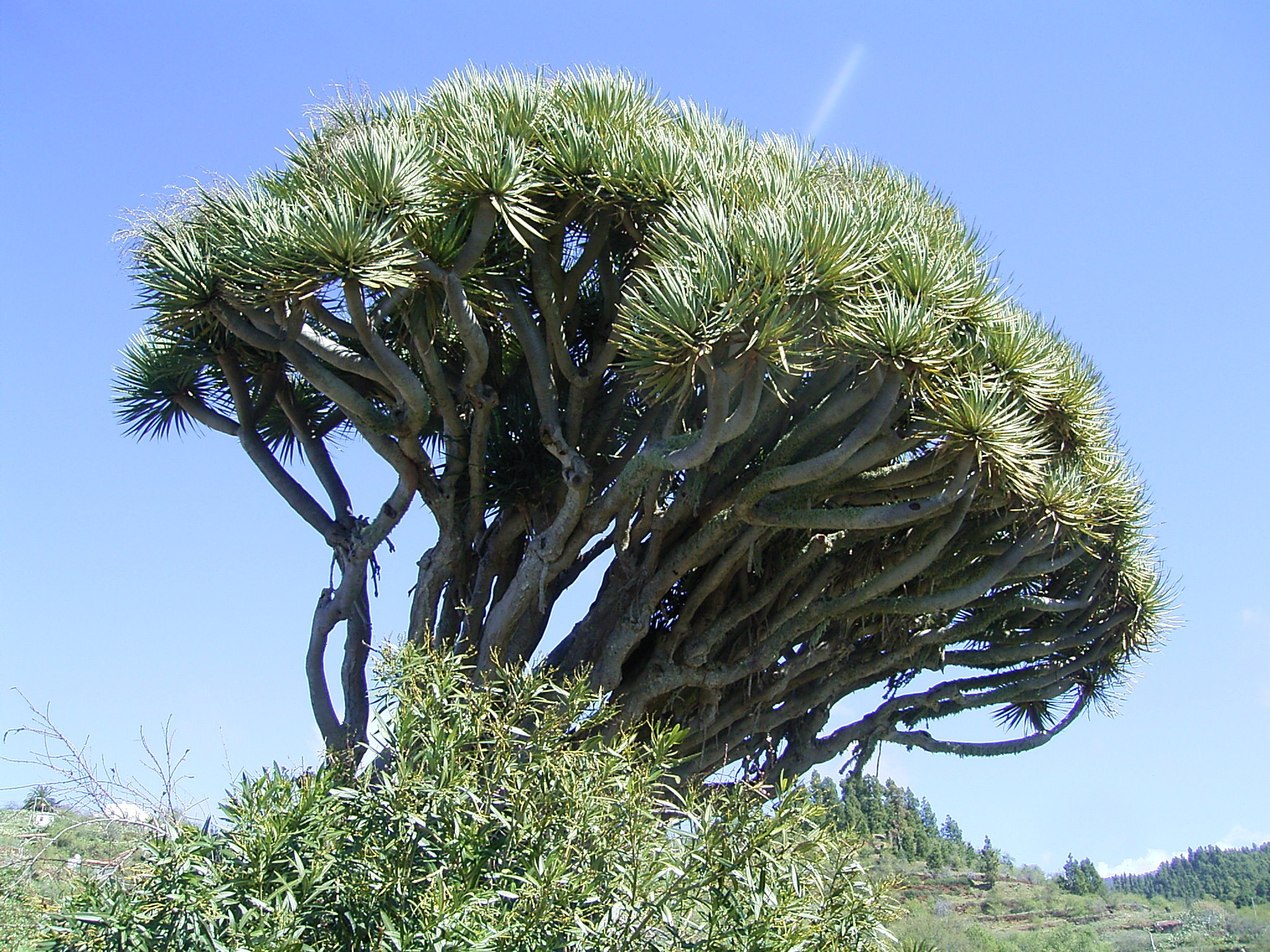
Convallarioideae: Dracaena draco

The subfamily Convallarioideae of the Asparagaceae sensu lato is treated in some systems as a separate family, under a variety of names, including Ruscaceae sensu lato. As with the subfamily Agavoideae, the Convallarioideae contains genera previously classified in a number of different families (including Ruscaceae sensu stricto, Nolinaceae sensu stricto, Convallariaceae sensu stricto and Eriospermaceae sensu stricto). When broadly defined, the group contains some 26 genera and almost 500 species, distributed mainly in the temperate to tropical regions of the Northern Hemisphere. There are few morphological features separating the subfamily from other groups within the Asparagaceae sensu lato. The small flowers are radially symmetrical, with six tepals, usually joined at the base, six stamens and a superior ovary. The fruit is usually a berry with few seeds. Species vary from herbaceous perennials to tree-like forms (e.g. Dracaena). There are several examples of convergent evolution between species in this subfamily and those in other subfamilies of the Asparagaceae sensu lato. Ruscus (butcher's broom) has photosynthetic branches (phylloclades), similar to those of Asparagus (Asparagoideae); Dracaena draco has a tree-like habit resembling Yucca (Agavoideae) and Cordyline (Lomandroideae). Some genera are used in horticulture: Sansevieria and Aspidistra are used as house plants in temperate areas and as garden plants in warmer regions; Polygonatum and Ophiopogon are used as garden plants in temperate areas.

== See also ==
- Taxonomy of Liliaceae

== Bibliography ==
- Bromhead, Edward Ffrench (1838). "An Attempt to ascertain Characters of the Botanical Alliances". Edinburgh New Philosophical Journal. 25: 123–134.
- Angiosperm Phylogeny Group II (2003), "An update of the Angiosperm Phylogeny Group classification for the orders and families of flowering plants: APG II", Botanical Journal of the Linnean Society, 141 (4): 399–436, doi:10.1046/j.1095-8339.2003.t01-1-00158.x
- Angiosperm Phylogeny Group III (2009), "An update of the Angiosperm Phylogeny Group classification for the orders and families of flowering plants: APG III", Botanical Journal of the Linnean Society, 161 (2): 105–121, doi:10.1111/j.1095-8339.2009.00996.x, hdl:10654/18083
- WCSP (2010), World Checklist of Selected Plant Families, Royal Botanic Gardens, Kew: Families included in the checklist
- Dahlgren, Rolf M.; Clifford, H.T. & Yeo, P.F. (1985). The Families of the Monocotyledons: structure, evolution, and taxonomy. Berlin: Springer-Verlag. ISBN 978-3-642-64903-5.
- Stevens, P.F. (2015) [1st. Pub. 2001], Angiosperm Phylogeny Website
- Chase, M.W.; Reveal, J.L. & Fay, M.F. (2009), "A subfamilial classification for the expanded asparagalean families Amaryllidaceae, Asparagaceae and Xanthorrhoeaceae", Botanical Journal of the Linnean Society, 161 (2): 132–136, doi:10.1111/j.1095-8339.2009.00999.x
- Kubitzki, K., ed. (1998), The Families and Genera of Vascular Plants, Vol. III, Monocotyledons: Lilianae (except Orchidaceae), Berlin: Springer-Verlag, ISBN 978-3-540-64060-8
- Goldblatt, P. (2002), "Iridaceae", in Argus, George W. (ed.), Flora of North America north of Mexico, Vol. 26, New York: Oxford University Press, p. 348ff, ISBN 978-0-19-515208-1
- Dimitri, M., ed. (1987), Enciclopedia Argentina de Agricultura y Jardinería, Tomo I. Descripción de plantas cultivadas, Buenos Aires: ACME S.A.C.I.
- Hessayon, D.G. (1999), The Bulb Expert, London: Transworld Publishers Ltd, ISBN 978-0-903505-42-0
- Seberg, Ole (2007), "Xanthorrhoeaceae", in Heywood, Vernon H.; Brummitt, Richard K.; Seberg, Ole & Culham, Alastair (eds.), Flowering Plant Families of the World, Ontario, Canada: Firefly Books, pp. 406–407
- Tapiero, Haim; Townsend, Danyelle M. & Tew, Kenneth D. (2004), "Alliaceae from organosulfur compounds in the prevention of human pathologies", Biomedicine & Pharmacotherapy, 58 (3): 183–193, doi:10.1016/j.biopha.2004.01.004, PMC 6361170, PMID 15164729
