= Leioproctus comosus =

Scientific classification
- Kingdom: Animalia
- Phylum: Arthropoda
- Clade: Pancrustacea
- Class: Insecta
- Order: Hymenoptera
- Family: Colletidae
- Genus: Leioproctus
- Species: L. comosus

Binomial name
- Leioproctus comosus Batley, 2025

Species of bee

Leioproctus comosus, or Leioproctus (Euryglossidia) comosus, is a species of bee in the family Colletidae and subfamily Colletinae. It is endemic to Australia. It was described by entomologist Michael Batley in 2025.

== Etymology ==
The specific epithet comosus (Latin: "hairy") is a reference to the female scuta.

== Description ==
The female body length is 5.8 mm. Integumental colouration is mainly black and dark brown to yellow-brown. The hair is white and brown.

== Distribution and habitat ==
The species occurs in south-west Western Australia. The type locality is Mount Gibson Sanctuary, in the Avon Wheatbelt bioregion.

== Behaviour ==
The adults are flying mellivores. Flowering plants visited by the bees include Borya species.
