= Borya septentrionalis =

- Growing on a rock face on Hinchinbrook Island, Queensland

Conservation status
- Least Concern (NCA)

Scientific classification
- Kingdom: Plantae
- Clade: Tracheophytes
- Clade: Angiosperms
- Clade: Monocots
- Order: Asparagales
- Family: Boryaceae
- Genus: Borya
- Species: B. septentrionalis

Binomial name
- Borya septentrionalis F.Muell.

Species of flowering plant

Borya septentrionalis is a species of plant in the family Boryaceae native to northeast Queensland, Australia.

== Description ==
Borya septentrionalis is a small, drought-tolerant, tussock- or mat-forming plant that grows on bare rock in upland areas of northeast Queensland. During dry periods it loses chlorophyll and turns orange-red, but will turn green again after rain, giving rise to the common name resurrection plant. It is also known as porcupine bush due to its spiky leaves.

== Conservation ==
This species is listed as least concern in the Queensland Government's Wildnet database. As of 10 September 2026, it has not been assessed by the International Union for Conservation of Nature.
