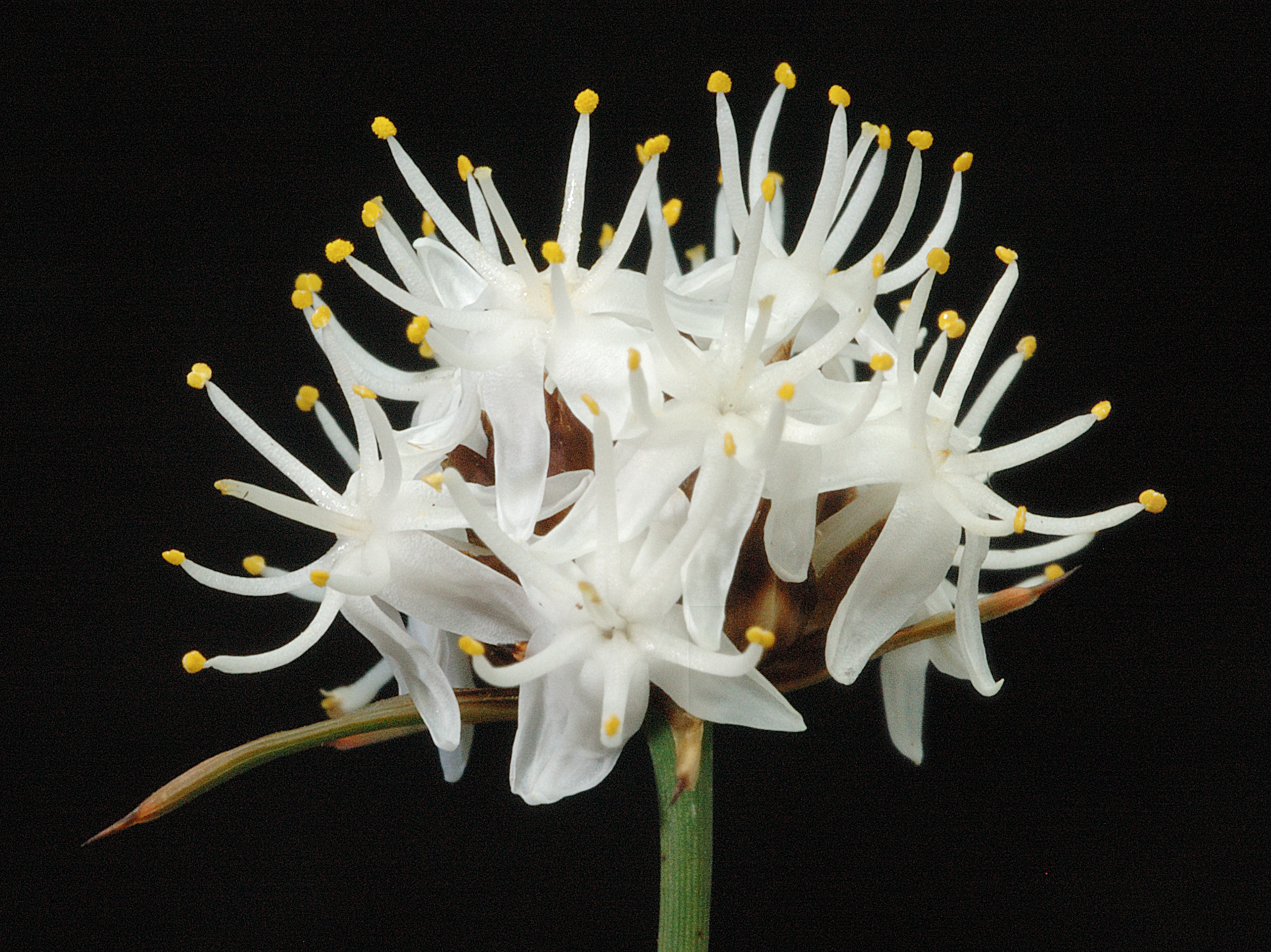

Scientific classification
- Kingdom: Plantae
- Clade: Tracheophytes
- Clade: Angiosperms
- Clade: Monocots
- Order: Asparagales
- Family: Boryaceae
- Genus: Borya
- Species: B. sphaerocephala

Binomial name
- Borya sphaerocephala R.Br.

= Borya sphaerocephala =

Species of flowering plant

Borya sphaerocephala is a perennial herbaceous plant found in southwest Australia. A common name for the species is pincushions. The height is 20–200 millimetres, White flowers appear between August and October. The species is associated with the region's granite outcrops, occurring in depressions and seasonally wet areas, growing in crevices and at the edge of moss mats. As a resurrection plant it is able to withstand seasonal dehydration of its environ. The species was first described by Robert Brown, published in his 1810 work on Australian plants. A combination Baumgartenia sphaerocephala, currently regarded as synonym, was published by Kurt Sprengel several years after Brown.
