= Alania cunninghamii =

Scientific classification
- Kingdom: Plantae
- Clade: Tracheophytes
- Clade: Angiosperms
- Clade: Monocots
- Order: Asparagales
- Family: Boryaceae
- Genus: Alania; Endl.
- Species: A. cunninghamii

Binomial name
- Alania cunninghamii Steud.

Synonyms
- Alania endlicheri Kunth

Species of flowering plant

Alania is a monotypic genus of flowering plants in the family Boryaceae, endemic to the State of New South Wales in Australia.

The single species is Alania cunninghamii.
