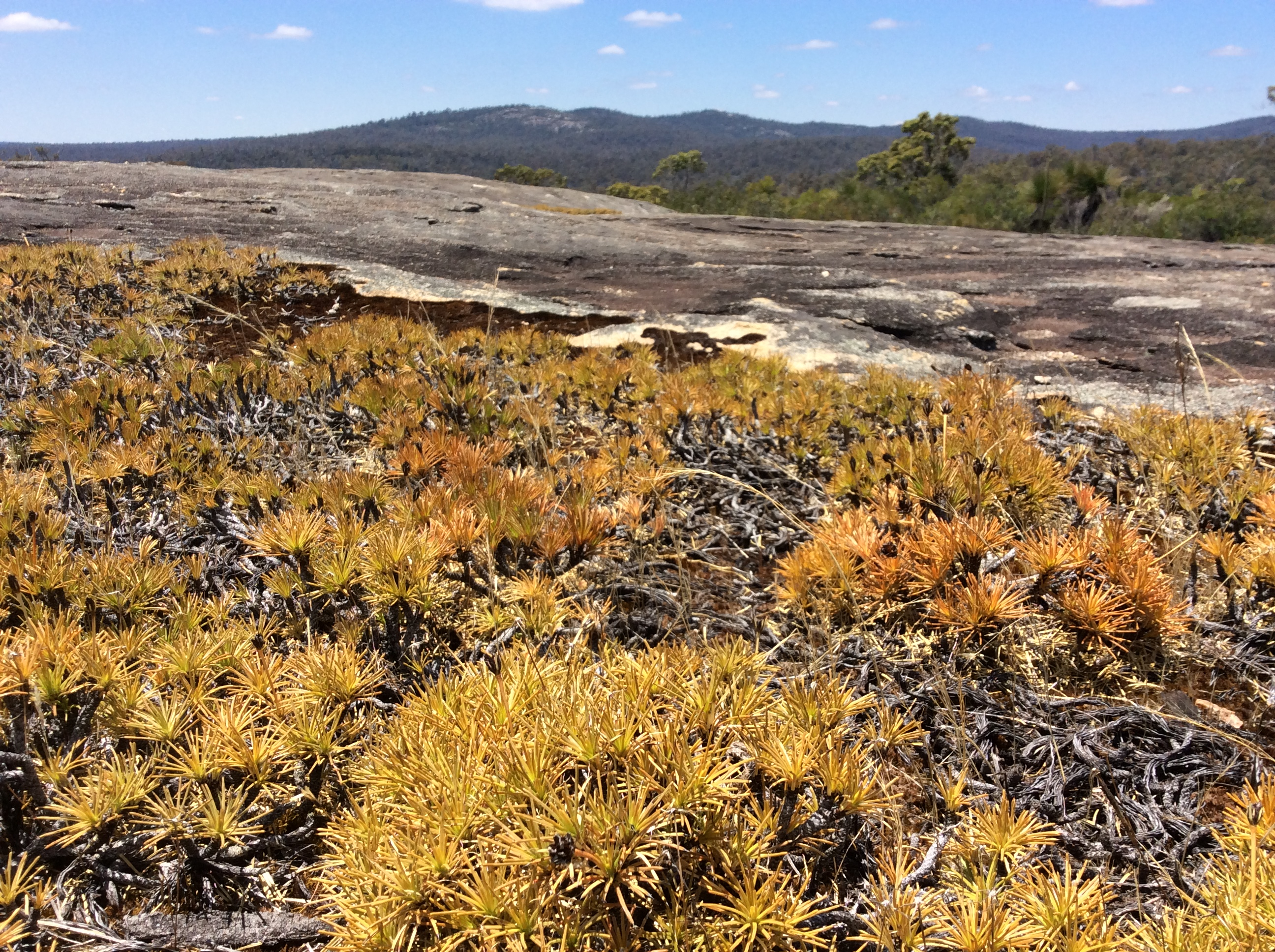
- Borya constricta habitat
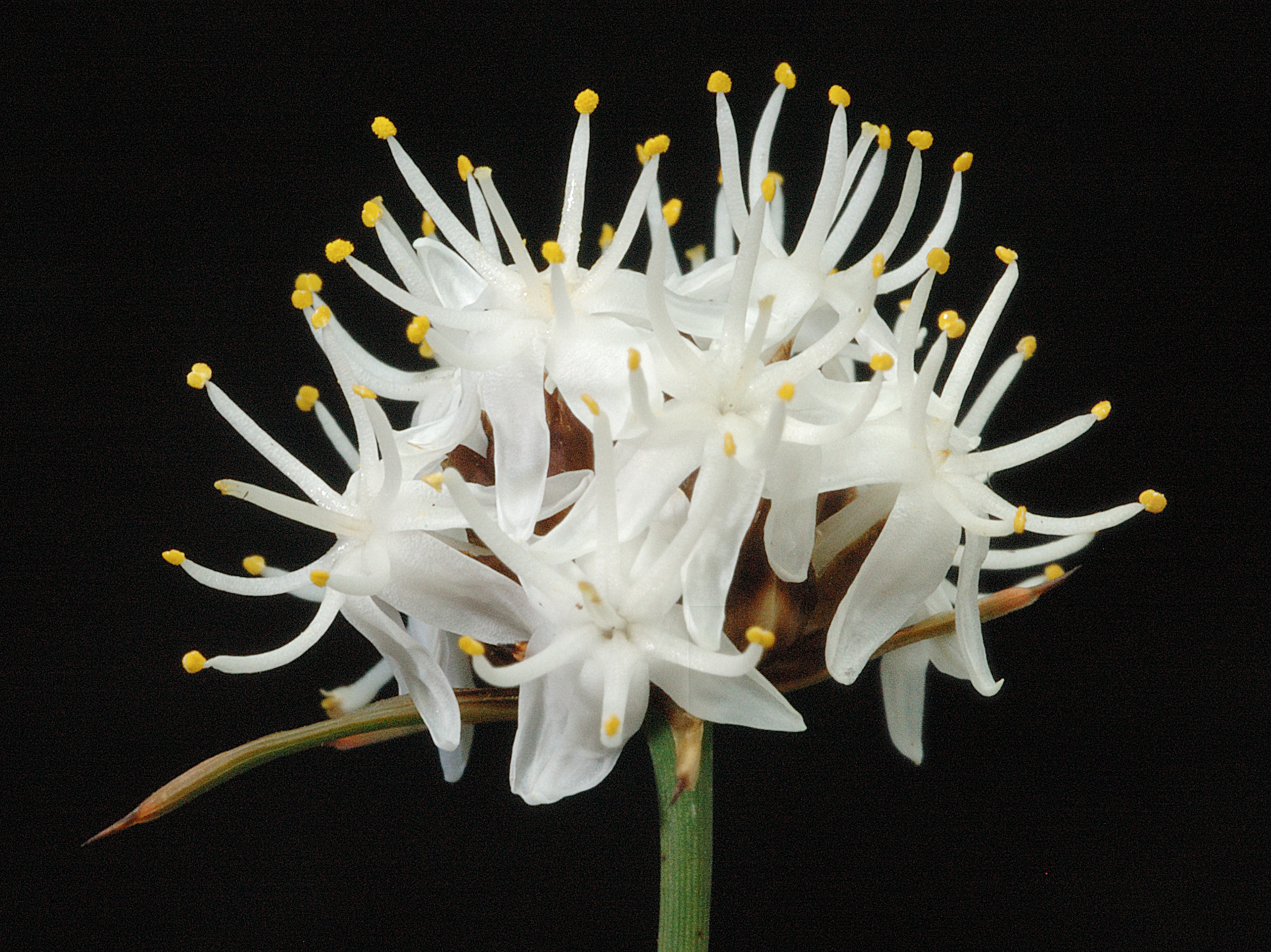
- Borya sphaerocephala flower

Scientific classification
- Kingdom: Plantae
- Clade: Tracheophytes
- Clade: Angiosperms
- Clade: Monocots
- Order: Asparagales
- Family: Boryaceae; M.W.Chase, Rudall & Conran

Genera
- Alania Endl.; Borya Labill.
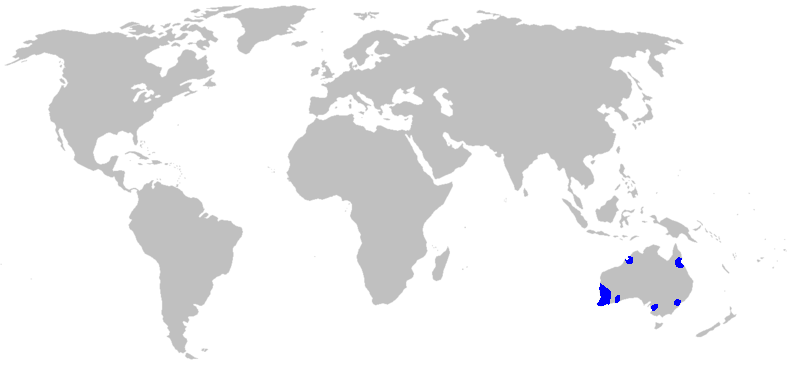
- Boryaceae distribution map

= Boryaceae =

Family of flowering plants

Boryaceae is a family of highly drought-tolerant flowering plants native to Australia, placed in the order Asparagales of the monocots. The family includes two genera, with twelve species in total in Australia.

Until recently, this family was not recognized by many taxonomists; most systems put the two genera, Borya and Alania, in the Anthericaceae or the Liliaceae. The 2016 APG IV system (unchanged from the 1998, 2003 and 2009 versions) does recognize this family and places it in the order Asparagales, in the clade monocots, based on molecular phylogenetic evidence that shows the two genera form a clade.
