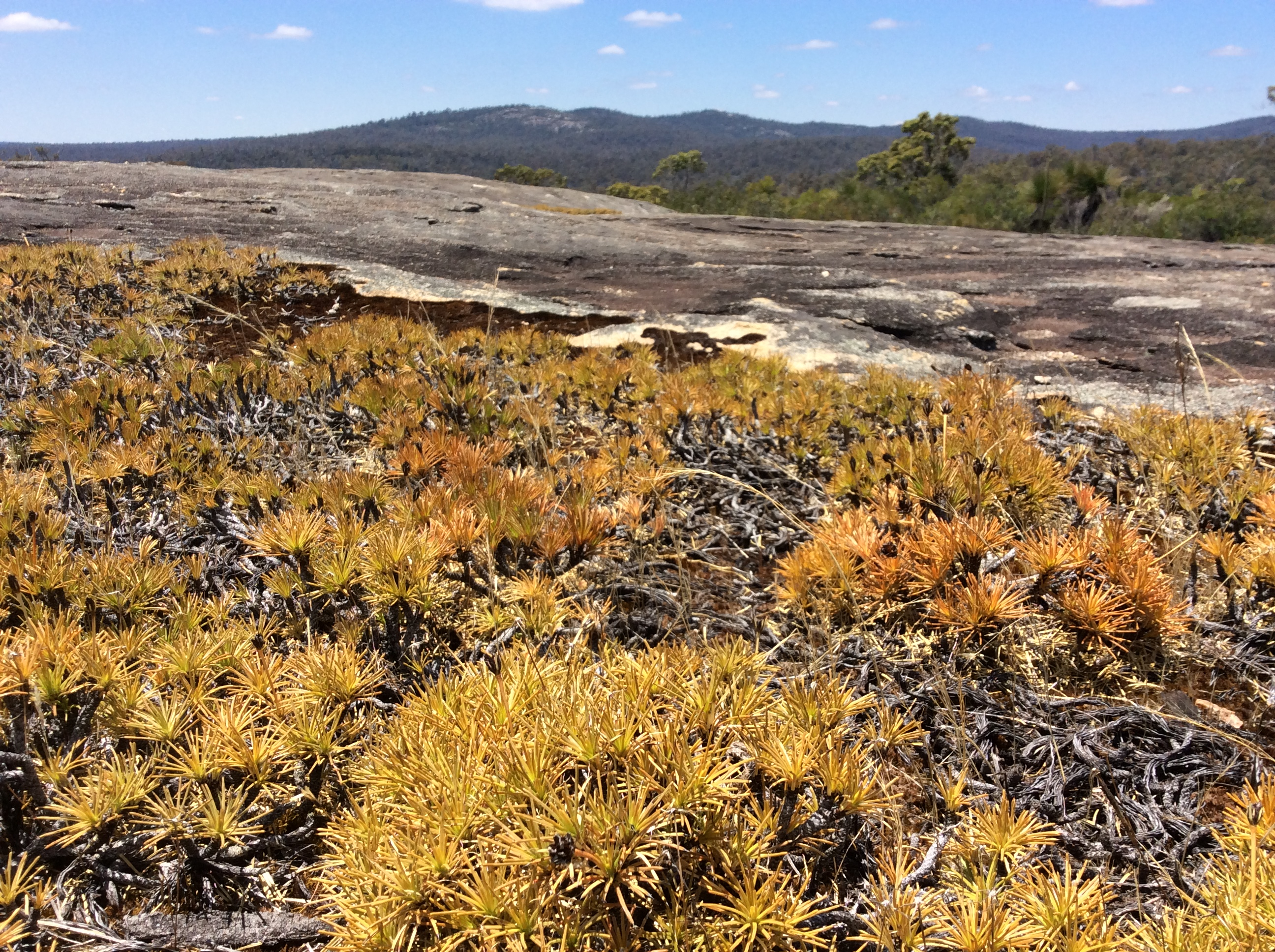
- Borya constricta habit
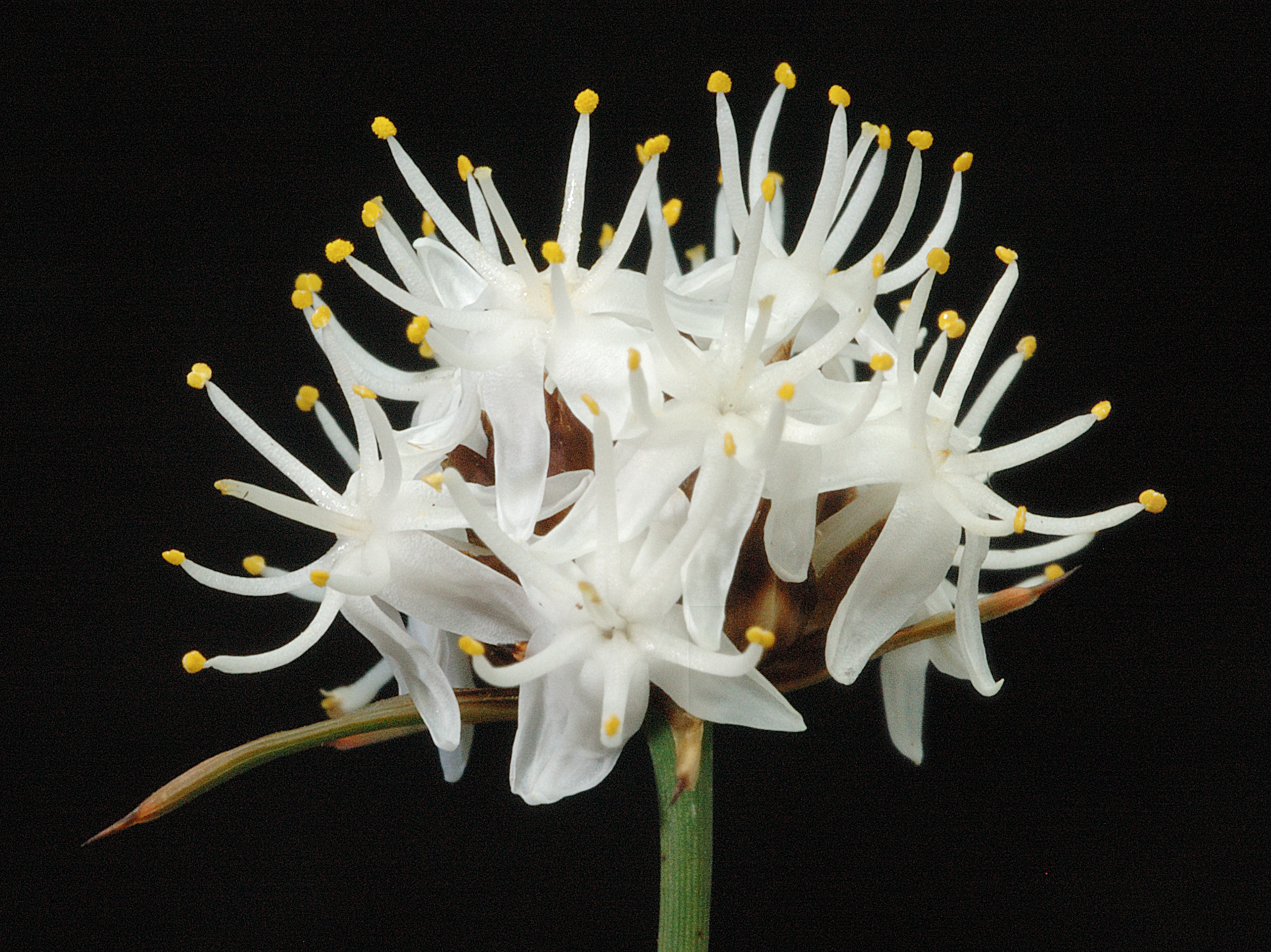
- Borya sphaerocephala flower

Scientific classification
- Kingdom: Plantae
- Clade: Tracheophytes
- Clade: Angiosperms
- Clade: Monocots
- Order: Asparagales
- Family: Boryaceae
- Genus: Borya; Labill.

Synonyms
- Baumgartenia Spreng.; Daviesia Poir. 1817, illegitimate homonym, not Sm. 1798

= Borya =

Genus of flowering plants

Borya is a genus of flowering plants in the family Boryaceae, endemic to Australia.

As of September 2026, Plants of the World Online accepted 12 species:

- Borya constricta Churchill - Western Australia
- Borya inopinata P.I.Forst. & E.J.Thomps. - Queensland
- Borya jabirabela Churchill - Northern Territory
- Borya laciniata Churchill - Western Australia
- Borya longiscapa Churchill - Western Australia
- Borya mirabilis Churchill - Victoria
- Borya nitida Labill. - Recherche Archipelago, Western Australia
- Borya scirpoidea Lindl. - Western Australia
- Borya septentrionalis F.Muell. - Queensland
- Borya sphaerocephala R.Br. - Western Australia
- Borya stenophylla M.D.Barrett - Western Australia
- Borya subulata G.A.Gardner - Western Australia

The Western Australian Herbarium also lists following undescribed species:

- Borya sp. Wheatbelt (A.S. George 16470)
