= Louis Percival Bosanquet =

British-American horticulturalist

Louis Percival Bosanquet (July 20, 1865- April 19, 1930) was a citrus farmer and horticulturist who lived in Fruitland Park, Florida. He is best known for his crinum lily hybrid and for introducing the camphor laurel tree to Florida.

Born to a wealthy family with ties to the British monarchy descended from French Huguenot exiles, Bosanquet left England in 1888 and joined his brothers Augustus and Eugene in central Florida. He married Ellen Lewis Hall, a descendant of George Washington, on November 4, 1891. The brothers oversaw the building of Fair Oaks, a grand estate on 100 acres (40 ha) with an eleven room mansion. On this land, they planted 20 acres (8.1 ha) of oranges and mandarins, and introduced the Red Ceylon peach to the area. Around 1893, Augustus left Florida to become Secretary of the Royal British Club in Lisbon, passing ownership of Fair Oaks to Louis. Upon taking ownership of the estate, Louis began growing and cultivating over 1,000 species of trees and plants, as well as compiling the largest horticulture library in the state of Florida.

Louis began hybridizing lilies in the early 1900s, his most popular being the crinum Ellen Bosanquet, named for his wife. This bloom, believed to be a cross between the hybrid named J.C. Harvey and either the crinum scabrum or crinum moorei. The plant is characterized by its "spicy fragrance" and "wine red" flowers that grow to approximately 3" tall. It is one of the most popular hybridized crinum lilies in the world.
