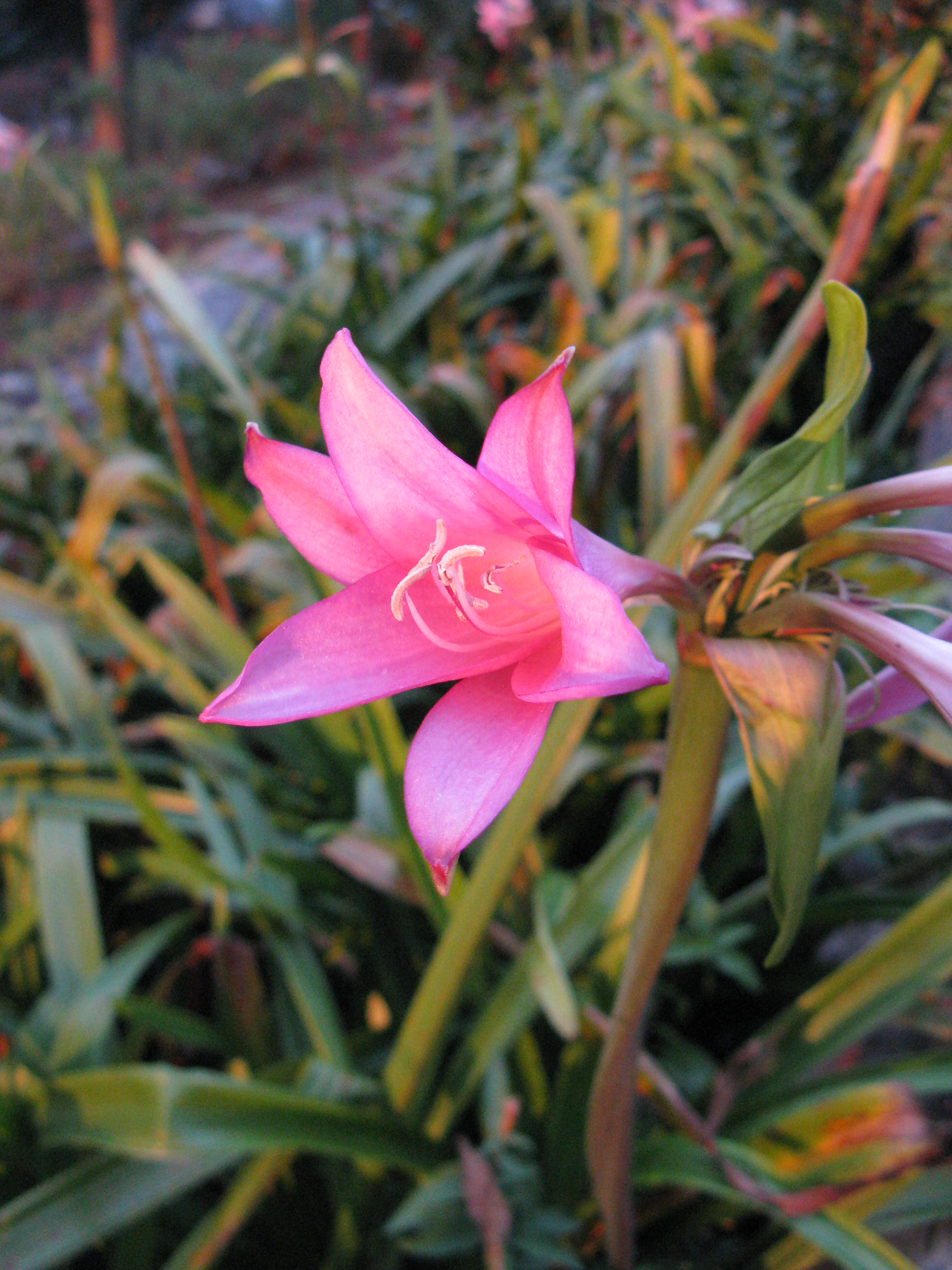

Scientific classification
- Kingdom: Plantae
- Clade: Tracheophytes
- Clade: Angiosperms
- Clade: Monocots
- Order: Asparagales
- Family: Amaryllidaceae
- Subfamily: Amaryllidoideae
- Genus: × Amarcrinum; Coutts

= × Amarcrinum =

Genus of flowering plants

The scientific name × Amarcrinum is applied to those hybrid plants obtained from artificial crosses between the genera Amaryllis and Crinum, although as of March 2014, the World Checklist of Selected Plant Families regards the name as "unplaced". They are grown as ornamental plants in gardens.

== Description ==
There are several variations possible since many species of Crinum can be combined with either of the two species of Amaryllis to produce hybrids with different characteristics. In general, almost all the hybrids have been between Crinum powellii and Amaryllis belladonna. This bulbous garden perennial has wide, deep green, tough, leathery, strap-shaped leaves to 60 cm long. The flower colour and exact growth habit will vary depending on which parental species have been used to make the cross but all of them are sweetly scented like Amaryllis with the tidy habit of evergreen Crinum. During late summer loose umbels of large, scented, pink funnel shaped flowers are held on stout stems, around 10 to 15 blooms on each.

== Hybrid species ==
Two species have been named, although neither name is accepted by the World Checklist of Selected Plant Families.

- × Amarcrinum memoria-corsii (Ragionieri) H. E. Moore is the result of crossing Amaryllis belladonna × Crinum moorei.
- × Amarcrinum traubii is the triple hybrid obtained by crossing Amaryllis × parkeri 'Hathor' × Crinum moorei.

== Uses ==
Several cultivars of × Amarcrinum have been raised and all of them are used as ornamental plants.
