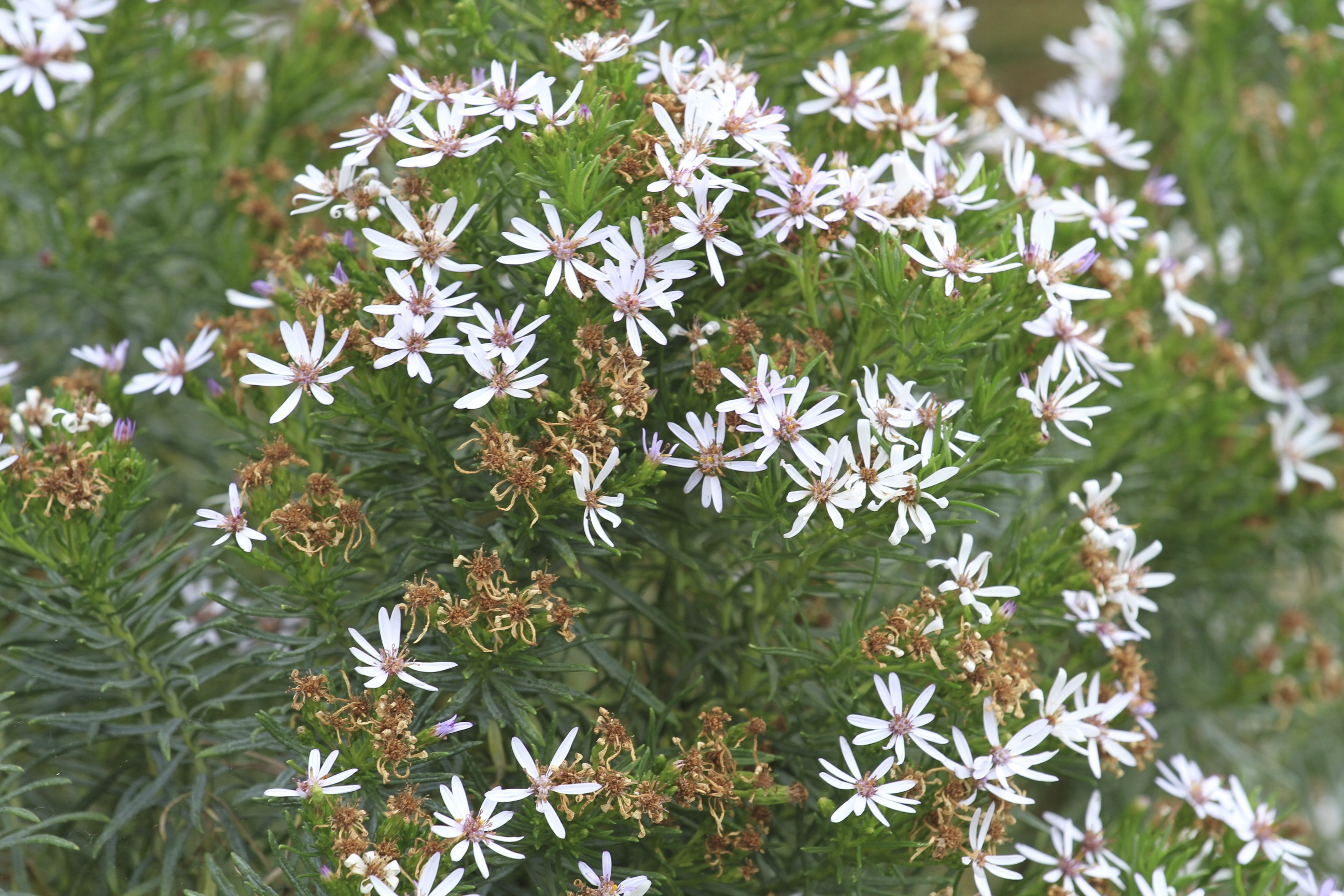

Scientific classification
- Kingdom: Plantae
- Clade: Tracheophytes
- Clade: Angiosperms
- Clade: Eudicots
- Clade: Asterids
- Order: Asterales
- Family: Asteraceae
- Genus: Olearia
- Species: O. glutinosa

Binomial name
- Olearia glutinosa (Lindl.) Benth.

Synonyms
- Aster orarius F.Muell.; Eurybia glutinosa Lindl.; Eurybia linifolia Hook.f.; Olearia oraria F.Muell. nom. inval., pro syn.; Olearia oraria (F.Muell.) Maiden & Betche; Shawia glutinosa (Lindl.) Sch.Bip.; Shawia linifolia (Hook.f.) Sch.Bip.

= Olearia glutinosa =

Species of plant

Olearia glutinosa, commonly known as sticky daisy-bush, is a species of flowering plant in the family Asteraceae and is endemic to south-eastern Australia. It is an erect, bushy, glabrous shrub with linear leaves and mauve, pink or white and yellow, daisy-like inflorescences.

== Description ==
Olearia glutinosa is an erect, bushy, glabrous shrub that typically grows to a height of 2–3 m (6 ft 7 in – 9 ft 10 in) and has sticky branchlets and leaves. Its leaves are arranged alternately along the branchlets, linear, 18–40 mm (0.71–1.57 in) long and 1–2 mm (0.039–0.079 in) wide, with a prominent mid-rib on the lower surface. The heads or daisy-like "flowers" are arranged in corymbs on the ends of branches, and are 12–19 mm (0.47–0.75 in) in diameter on a peduncle up to 1 mm (0.039 in) long with two or three rows of bracts at the base. Each head has four to ten ray florets, the ligules mauve, pink or white and 5–8 mm (0.20–0.31 in) long, surrounding six to twelve violet, white or yellow disc florets. Flowering mostly occurs from November to January and the fruit is a ribbed achene 2–3 mm (0.079–0.118 in) long, the pappus 4–5 mm (0.16–0.20 in) long.

== Taxonomy ==
Sticky daisy-bush was first formally described in 1839 by John Lindley who gave it the name Eurybia glutinosa in Edwards's Botanical Register, from specimens of plants raised by the Royal Horticultural Society from seed collected by Daniel Bunce. In 1867, George Bentham changed the name to Olearia glutinosa in Flora Australiensis. The specific epithet (glutinosa) means "sticky".

== Distribution and habitat ==
Olearia glutinosa grows in scrub on coastal dunes or on sandstone or limestone cliffs on the coast of Victoria, south-eastern South Australia, and the north and west coasts of Tasmania, including on King Island.
