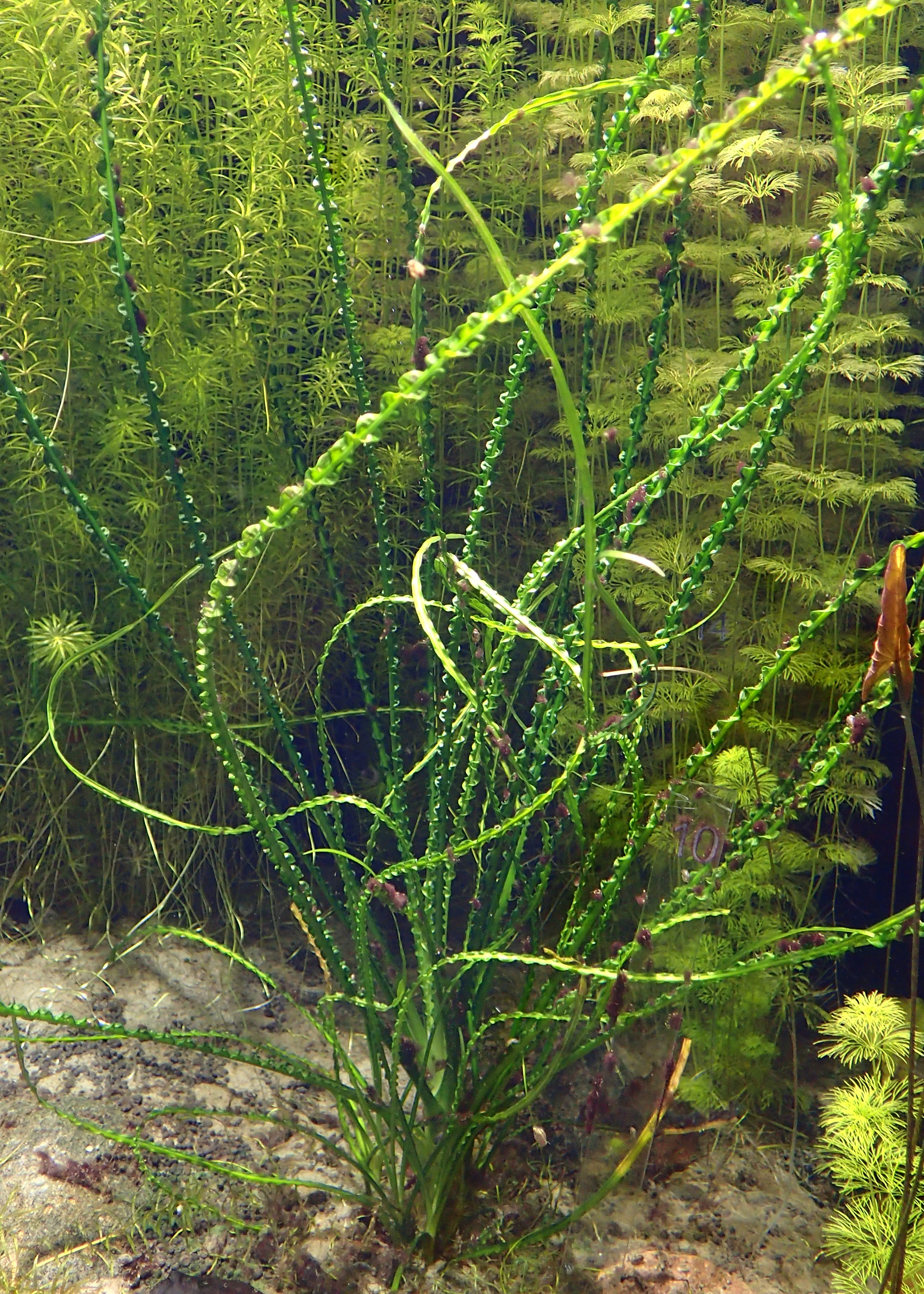
- Crinum calamistratum in the Botanischer Garten, Berlin-Dahlem

Scientific classification
- Kingdom: Plantae
- Clade: Tracheophytes
- Clade: Angiosperms
- Clade: Monocots
- Order: Asparagales
- Family: Amaryllidaceae
- Subfamily: Amaryllidoideae
- Genus: Crinum
- Species: C. calamistratum

Binomial name
- Crinum calamistratum Bogner & Heine

= Crinum calamistratum =

Species of plant in the amaryllis family

Crinum calamistratum is an aquatic angiosperm native to Cameroon. It is known by the common names of narrow crinum or African onion plant.

The species was first discovered by botanist H. Gregory from a population near Kumba, Cameroon in 1948, and was described by Josef Bogner and Hermann Heino Heine in 1987.

== Habitat ==
The natural habitat of the species is not well known. It is known to be locally distributed in an ephemeral river.

== Description ==
C. calamistratum is an aquatic plant with distinct, curly leaves and a thick, onion-like bulb. Flowers are showy and white. The leaves can grow to exceed 200 centimetres (80 in) in length.

== Cultivation ==
The species is commonly used as an ornamental plant in freshwater aquascaping. It is very tolerant of many water conditions including brackish water. It requires medium to high intensity light. It does not often reproduce sexually in captivity, but can be propagated asexually.
