= Crinum malabaricum =

- Crinum malabaricum at Embat, Kannur

Scientific classification
- Kingdom: Plantae
- Clade: Tracheophytes
- Clade: Angiosperms
- Clade: Monocots
- Order: Asparagales
- Family: Amaryllidaceae
- Subfamily: Amaryllidoideae
- Genus: Crinum
- Species: C. malabaricum

Binomial name
- Crinum malabaricum Lekhak & S.R.Yadav

Species of plant

Crinum malabaricum is a plant species belonging to the family Amaryllidaceae.

== Description ==
It is a fully immersed herb growing from tunicated bulb. There are 8-19 flat, strap shaped leaves per bulb. Leaves are whitish in the base, dark green above and floating on the water surface. They gradually narrow from base to apex and are with minute forward pointed spinules. White sweet scented flowers with dark red styles are seen in umbels.

== Range ==
This species was first described from Periya, Kasargod in 2012

== Habitat ==
Grows in seasonally running streams along with other water loving plants
