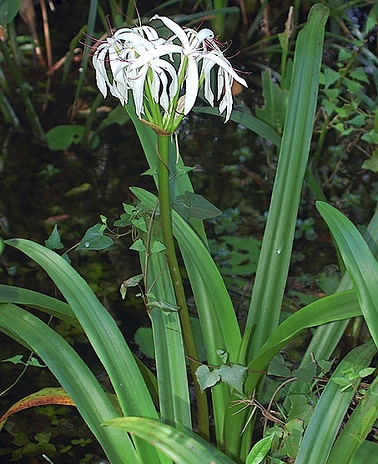
- American Crinum

Conservation status
- Secure (NatureServe)

Scientific classification
- Kingdom: Plantae
- Clade: Tracheophytes
- Clade: Angiosperms
- Clade: Monocots
- Order: Asparagales
- Family: Amaryllidaceae
- Subfamily: Amaryllidoideae
- Genus: Crinum
- Species: C. americanum

Binomial name
- Crinum americanum L.

Synonyms
- Bulbine uncinata Moench; Crinum caribaeum Baker; Crinum ceruleum Raf.; Crinum commelyni DC.; Crinum conicum M.Roem.; Crinum floridanum Griseb.; Crinum herbertianum Schult. & Schult.f.; Crinum longiflorum Herb.; Crinum roozenianum O'Brien; Crinum strictum Herb.; Crinum texanum Hannibal; Scadianus multiflorus Raf.

= Crinum americanum =

Species of plant in the amaryllis family

Crinum americanum is an aquatic angiosperm native to North America from Texas to South Carolina, as well as Mexico, Cuba, Jamaica and the Cayman Islands. Common names for this species include Florida swamp-lily, string lily, and southern swamp crinum. The species grows in small groups in still water habitats.

Crinum species are now members of the family Amaryllidaceae, subfamily Amaryllidoideae; they were formerly placed in the family Liliaceae.

== Etymology ==
The Latin specific epithet americanum refers to the plant's native habitat.

== Description ==
Crinum americanum is a perennial bulb that can grow up to 4 ft (1.2 m) tall. The plant has simple leaves that are up to 4 ft (1.2 m) long and 3 in (7.6 cm) wide. Flowers are fragrant and lily-like with white petals that can sometimes be blushed pink in color. The flower stem grows up to 3 ft (0.91 m) tall and has two to six flowered umbels. The upper portion of the stamen is purple and anthers are also purple in color.

== Distribution and habitat ==
It is native to North America from Texas to South Carolina, as well as Mexico, Cuba, Jamaica and the Cayman Islands. It grows in freshwater marshes, cypress swamps, and lake edges.

== Conservation ==
As of November 2024, NatureServe listed Crinum americanum as Secure (G5). This status was last reviewed on 4 August 1988.
