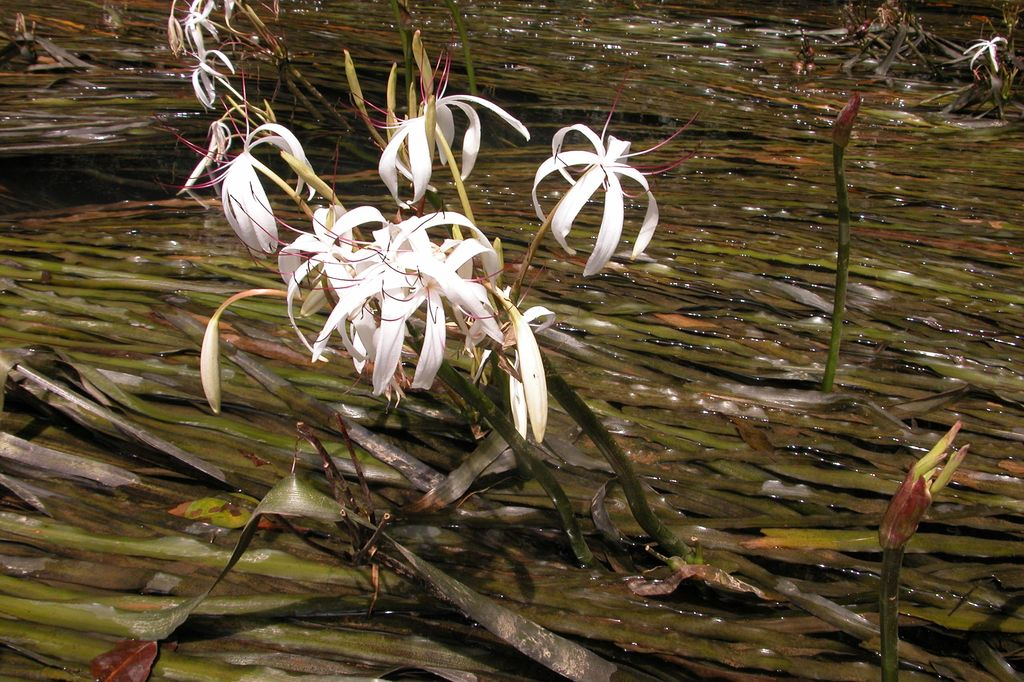

Conservation status
- Endangered (IUCN 3.1)

Scientific classification
- Kingdom: Plantae
- Clade: Embryophytes
- Clade: Tracheophytes
- Clade: Spermatophytes
- Clade: Angiosperms
- Clade: Monocots
- Order: Asparagales
- Family: Amaryllidaceae
- Subfamily: Amaryllidoideae
- Genus: Crinum
- Species: C. thaianum

Binomial name
- Crinum thaianum J. Schulze
- Crinum thaianum is endemic to Thailand

= Crinum thaianum =

Species of aquatic plant

Crinum thaianum, also called the Thai onion plant or water onion, or Phlap Phueng Than, is an emergent plant species, endemic to the coastal plain of Ranong and Phang Nga Provinces, Thailand. Its natural habitat is to grow along the banks of flowing, medium- to fast-running streams, where its roots and bulb are submerged in the sediment, while its leaves grow long in the current and can access fresh air at the surface. When in bloom, the flower is an umbel of large, showy blossoms above the waterline. These growth habits make it a popular addition for tropical aquaria, and it is sold in many regions to be used specifically for growth within displays of tropical fish. It also serves the added benefit of oxygenating the water and absorbing ammonia, which is toxic to most aquatic animals. In nature, however, the species is threatened with extinction, and diminishing rapidly, due to habitat destruction.

== Description ==
The leaves are long, up to 150 cm (59 in) (or longer; up to 300 cm (120 in) according to Schulze) while only about 2.5 cm (0.98 in) wide, tough, ribbon-like, and bright green; they grow from a bulb that looks much like an onion. The flowers are white, lily-like, and form on a long stalk emerging above the water's surface.

== Etymology ==
The specific epithet thaianum refers to Thailand, this species' country of origin.

== Cultivation ==
Crinum thaianum is cultivated as an aquatic ornamental to decorate aquaria. It requires water temperatures of 22–30 °C (72–86 °F) and is popular in home aquaria because it is easy to keep, tolerant of temperature swings and lighting variations, and because its leaves are tough enough to withstand the attention of herbivorous fish. Propagation is from daughter bulbs. It likes a rich substrate and additional CO_{2} encourages growth with space to spread and grow. It does well in a warm outside pond.

== Status and threats ==
Crinum thaianum is not under protection by any legislation in Thailand and also not protected by CITES. The habitats of this species are also not under protection.

Only 1% of the species is remaining. Moreover, its found population is highly fragmented and rapidly decreasing. In some habitats, it is already extinct due to excessive collection of their bulbs for commercial purposes, dredging under flooding control schemes, and land use changes. Currently, Crinum thaianum has been listed as Endangered under IUCN Redlist and Thailand Data Redlist. A special management and conservation plan is urgently needed to reduce decrease and extinction.
