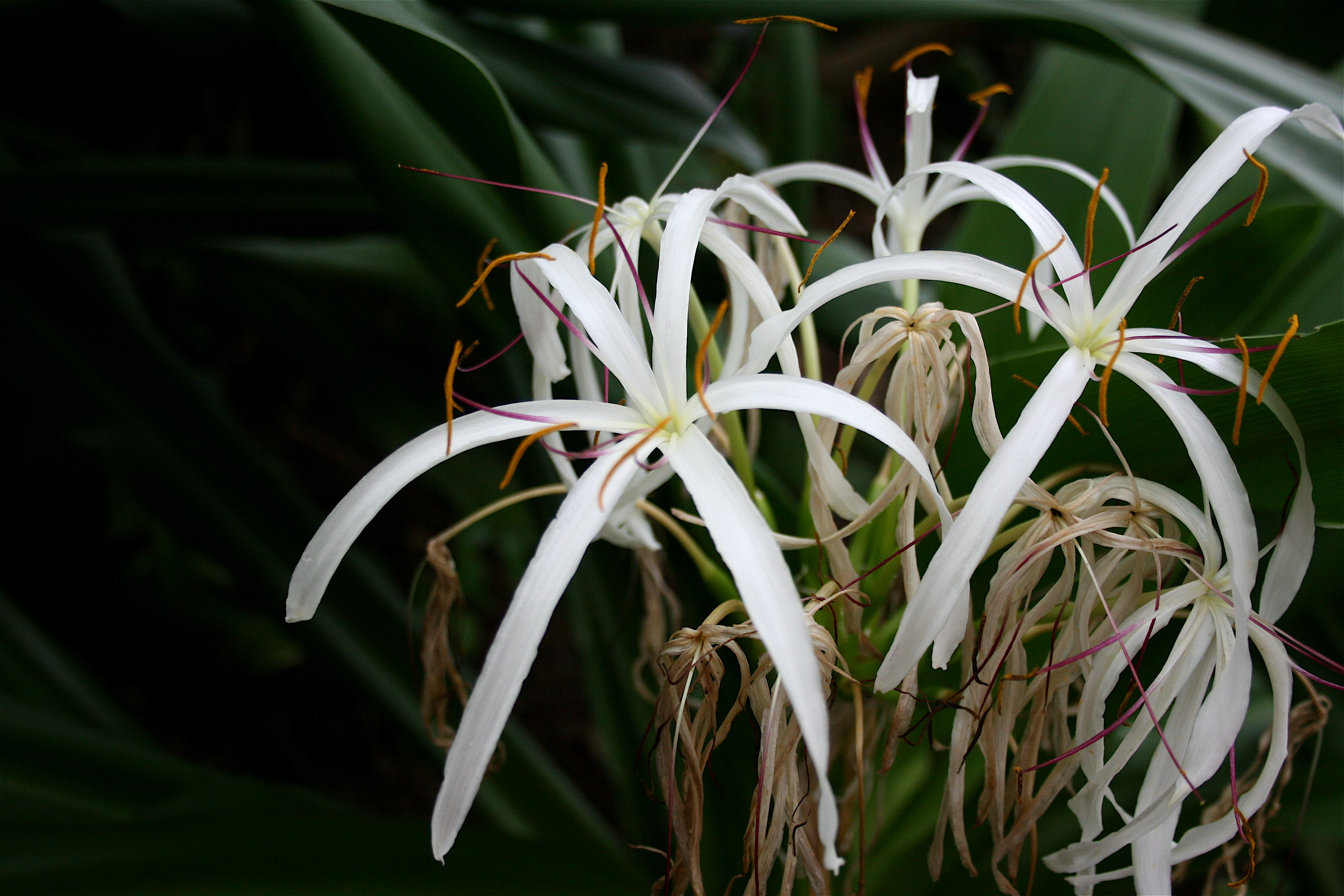

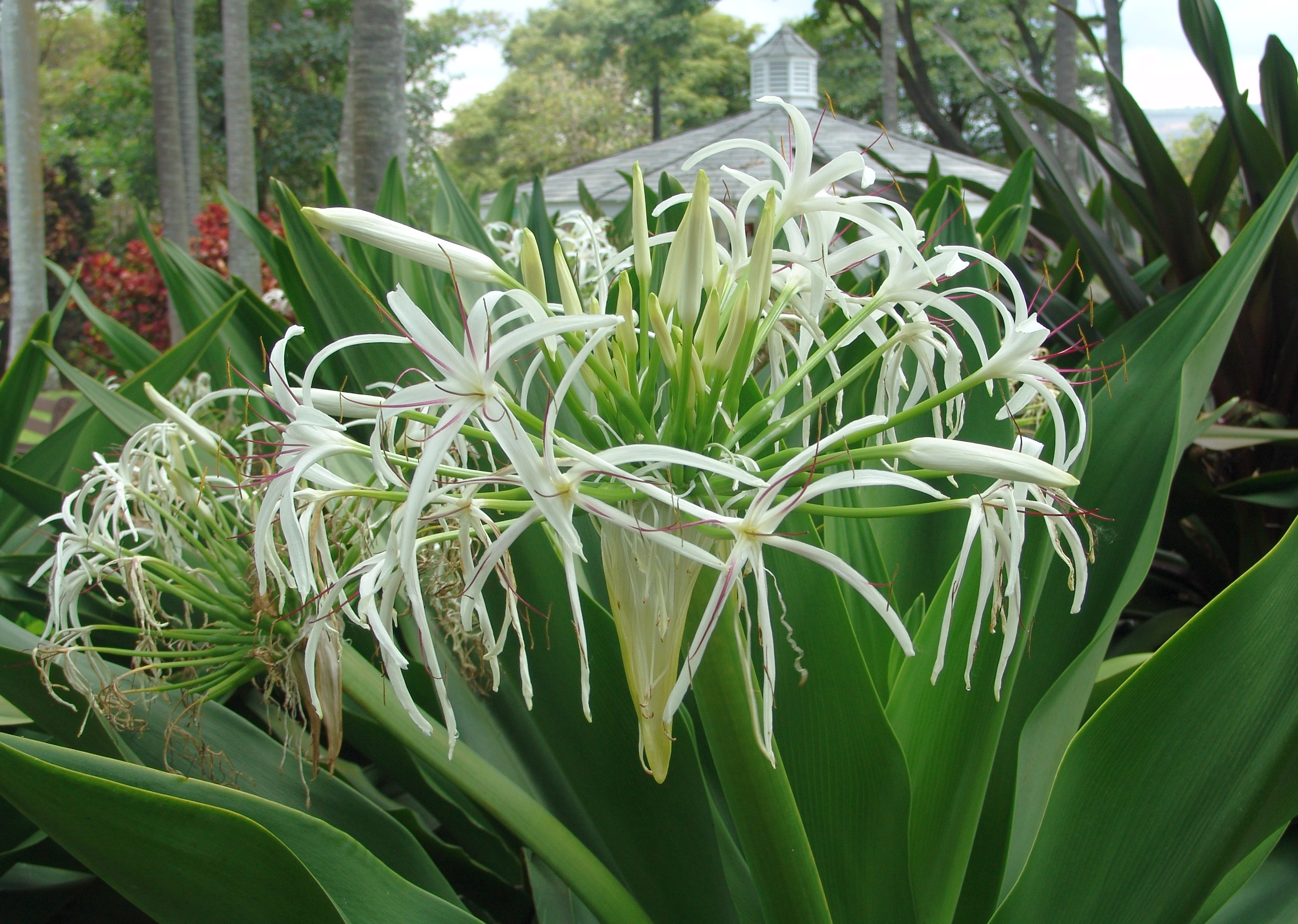

Scientific classification
- Kingdom: Plantae
- Clade: Tracheophytes
- Clade: Angiosperms
- Clade: Monocots
- Order: Asparagales
- Family: Amaryllidaceae
- Subfamily: Amaryllidoideae
- Genus: Crinum
- Species: C. asiaticum

Binomial name
- Crinum asiaticum L.

Synonyms
- 68 synonyms: for Crinum asiaticum; Bulbine asiatica (L.) Gaertn.; Crinum brevifolium Roxb.; Crinum toxicarium var. asiaticum (L.) Herb.; for var. asiaticum; Amaryllis carnosa Hook.f.; Crinum albiflorum Noronha; Crinum angustifolium Herb. ex Steud.; Crinum anomalum Herb.; Crinum asiaticum subvar. angustium Herb.; Crinum asiaticum var. anomalum (Herb.) Herb.; Crinum asiaticum var. bracteatum Herb.; Crinum asiaticum subvar. brevifolium Herb.; Crinum asiaticum var. declinatum (Herb.) Herb.; Crinum asiaticum subvar. minor Herb.; Crinum asiaticum var. procerum (Herb.) Baker; Crinum asiaticum var. toxicarium (Roxb.) Herb.; Crinum bancanum Kurz; Crinum bracteatum Willd.; Crinum bracteatum purpurascens Van Geert; Crinum brevifolium var. bracteatum (Willd.) Herb.; Crinum brevifolium var. latifolium Herb.; Crinum carinifolium Stokes; Crinum cortifolium Hallier f.; Crinum declinatum Herb.; Crinum diclinatum Carey ex Herb.; Crinum firmifolium var. hygrophilum H.Perrier; Crinum floridanum Herb.; Crinum floridum Fraser ex Herb.; Crinum hornemannianum M.Roem.; Crinum macrantherum Engl.; Crinum macrocarpon Herb.; Crinum macrophyllum Hallier f.; Crinum northianum Baker; Crinum plicatum Livingstone ex Hook.; Crinum procerum Herb.; Crinum redouteanum M.Roem.; Crinum rigidum Herb.; Crinum rigidum var. macrocarpon (Herb.) Herb.; Crinum rigidum var. sumatranum (Roxb.) Herb.; Crinum rumphii Merr.; Crinum sumatranum Roxb.; Crinum toxicarium Roxb.; Crinum umbellatum Carey ex Herb.; Crinum woolliamsii L.S.Hannibal; Crinum zanthophyllum L.S.Hannibal; Haemanthus pubescens Blanco; Lilium pendulum Noronha; for var. japonicum; Crinum japonicum (Baker) L.S.Hannibal; Crinum maritimum Siebold ex Nakai; for var. pedunculatum; Crinum australe var. pedunculatum (R.Br.) Herb.; Crinum pedunculatum R.Br.; Crinum australe Herb.; Crinum australe var. canaliculatum (Roxb.) Herb.; Crinum australe var. exaltatum (Herb.) Herb.; Crinum australe var. rubricaule Herb.; Crinum brachyandrum Herb.; Crinum brevilimbum Carey ex Herb.; Crinum canaliculatum Roxb.; Crinum douglasii F.M.Bailey; Crinum exaltatum Herb.; Crinum norfolkianum A.Cunn.; Crinum pedunculatum pacificum Van Geert; Crinum rubricaule M.Roem.; Crinum taitense Redouté; Crinum taitense var. queenslandicum Domin; for var. sinicum; Crinum sinicum Roxb. ex Herb.; Crinum chinense Lodd. ex Kunth; Crinum loureiroi M.Roem.; Crinum sinicum subvar. variegatum Herb.

= Crinum asiaticum =

Species of plant in the amaryllis family

Crinum asiaticum, commonly known as poison bulb, giant crinum lily, grand crinum lily, or spider lily, is a plant species widely planted in many warmer regions as an ornamental. It is a bulb-forming perennial producing an umbel of large, showy flowers that are prized by gardeners. However, all parts of the plant are poisonous if ingested. Some reports indicate exposure to the sap may cause skin irritation.

Crinum asiaticum is native to East Asia, tropical Asia, Australia and islands of the Pacific and western Indian oceans. It is naturalized in Mexico, the West Indies, the US (Florida and Louisiana), numerous Pacific islands, Madagascar and the Chagos Archipelago.

== Description ==
Crinum asiaticum is a perennial herb that typically grows up to 1.2 m (3.9 ft) tall. It has a leaf base. Its pseudobulb is spherical. The upper part of the bulb is cylindrical. The base is laterally branched, with a diameter of about 6–15 cm (2.4–5.9 in). Its leaves are lanceolate, margin undulate, apically acuminate. They feature 1 sharp point and are dark green, growing up to 1 m long. Their width is 7–12 cm (2.8–4.7 in) or wider and they number 20–30. The inflorescence is an umbel with 10-24 flowers, six petaloid tepals, and aromatic. The flower stem is erect, as long as the leaf, and solid. The spathe is lanceolate, membranous, and 6–10 cm (2.4–3.9 in). The bractlet liner is 3–7 cm (1.2–2.8 in). Its perianth tube is slender and straight, green white, 7–10 cm (2.8–3.9 in), diameter 1.5–2 mm. The corolla is spider-like shaped, white, linear, revolute, attenuate, 4.5–9 cm (1.8–3.5 in) long, and 6–9 mm wide. The corolla is 6-lobed. The pedicel is ca. 0.5–2.5 cm (0.2–1.0 in) long. It has 6 reddish stamens. The filaments are 4–5 cm (1.6–2.0 in) long. The anthers are liner, attenuate, ca. 1.5 cm (0.6 in) long or more. The ovary is fusiform, and up to 2 cm (0.8 in) long. The fruit is an oblate capsule, green, and 3–5 cm (1.2–2.0 in) in diameter. The seeds are large, and the exotesta is spongy.

== Infraspecies ==
Four varieties are accepted by Plants of the World Online as of April 2026:

- Crinum asiaticum var. asiaticum (autonym)
- Crinum asiaticum var. japonicum Baker
- Crinum asiaticum var. pedunculatum (R.Br.) Fosberg & Sachet
- Crinum asiaticum var. sinicum (Roxb. ex Herb.) Baker

== Toxicity ==
The entire plant is toxic, especially the bulb. It contains a variety of alkaloids such as lycorine and tazettine. When eaten, it can cause vomiting, abdominal pain, severe diarrhea, constipation, irregular breathing, rapid pulse, fever, etc.; sufficient misuse can cause nervous system paralysis and death.

== Use ==
The Tao people indigenous to Taiwan's Orchid Island uses slices of its stem (known as vakong) tied to a heavy object to bait fish going into their nets. The Paiwan and Puyuma peoples use this plant (livakong) as a natural boundary plant.
