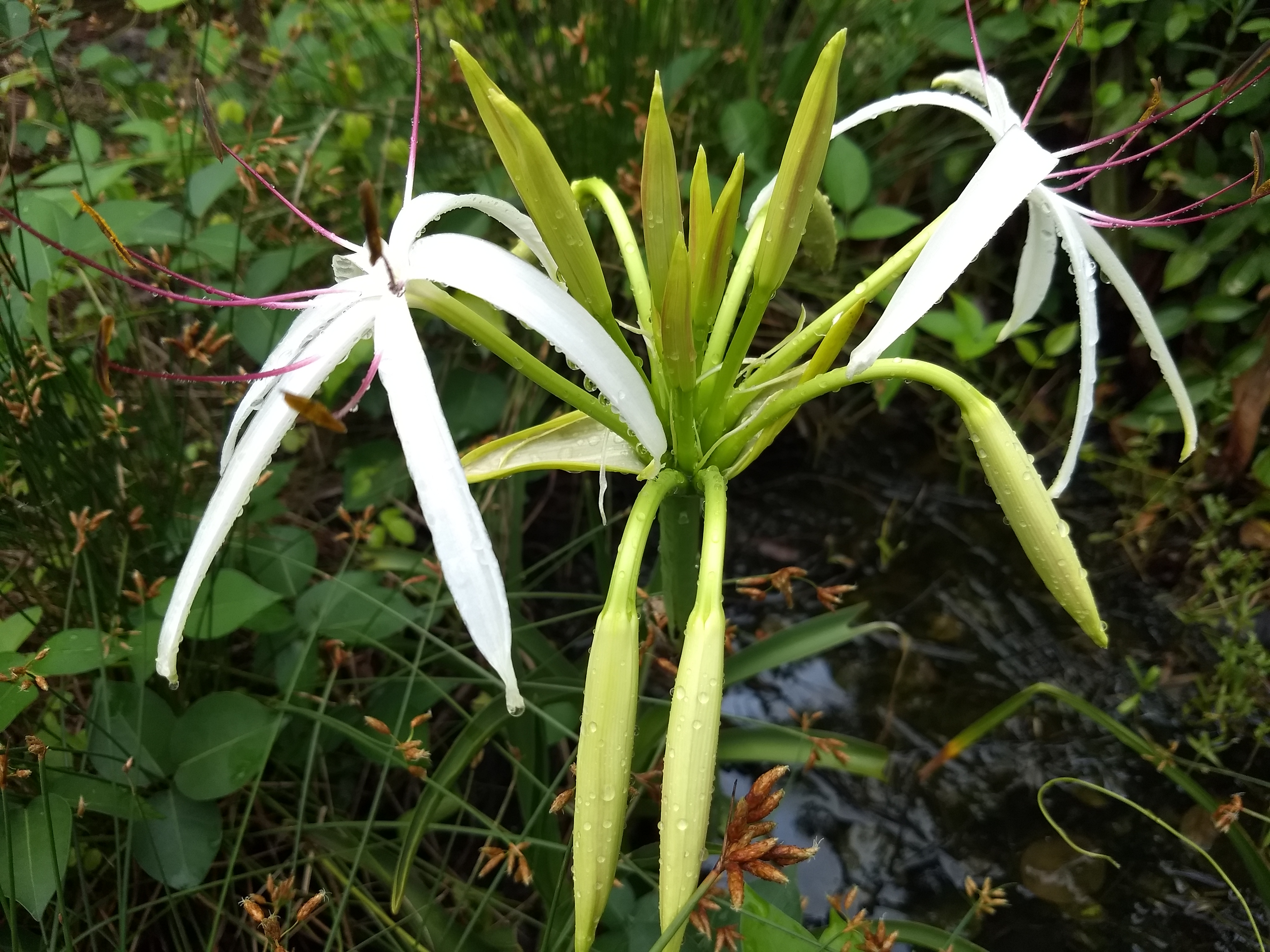

Scientific classification
- Kingdom: Plantae
- Clade: Tracheophytes
- Clade: Angiosperms
- Clade: Monocots
- Order: Asparagales
- Family: Amaryllidaceae
- Subfamily: Amaryllidoideae
- Tribe: Amaryllideae
- Subtribe: Crininae
- Genus: Crinum
- Species: C. viviparum

Binomial name
- Crinum viviparum (Lam.) R. Ansari & V.J.Nair

Synonyms
- List: Crinum viviparum var. ensifolium Crinum roxburghii Dalzell & A.Gibson Crinum ensifolium Roxb. ex Ker Gawl. Crinum defixum f. stephenhassardii Crinum defixum var. ensifolium Crinum defixum Ker Gawl. Amaryllis vivipara Lam. Amaryllis coenosa Hook.f.

= Crinum viviparum =

Species of flowering plant

Crinum viviparum is a Monocot plant species in the family Amaryllidaceae distributed across Asia. No subspecies are listed in the Catalogue of Life.

== Distribution and description ==
Crinum viviparum is widely distributed in Asia: from the Indian subcontinent to Indo-China. In Vietnam names for this species include: nàng, nàng la gươm, and náng hoa đỏ.

Wild specimens may have a main stem up to 600 mm (24 in) tall, supported from a bulb 50–60 mm (2.0–2.4 in) wide. Flowers may be 50–60 mm (2.0–2.4 in) and white with pinkish margins.

== Gallery ==
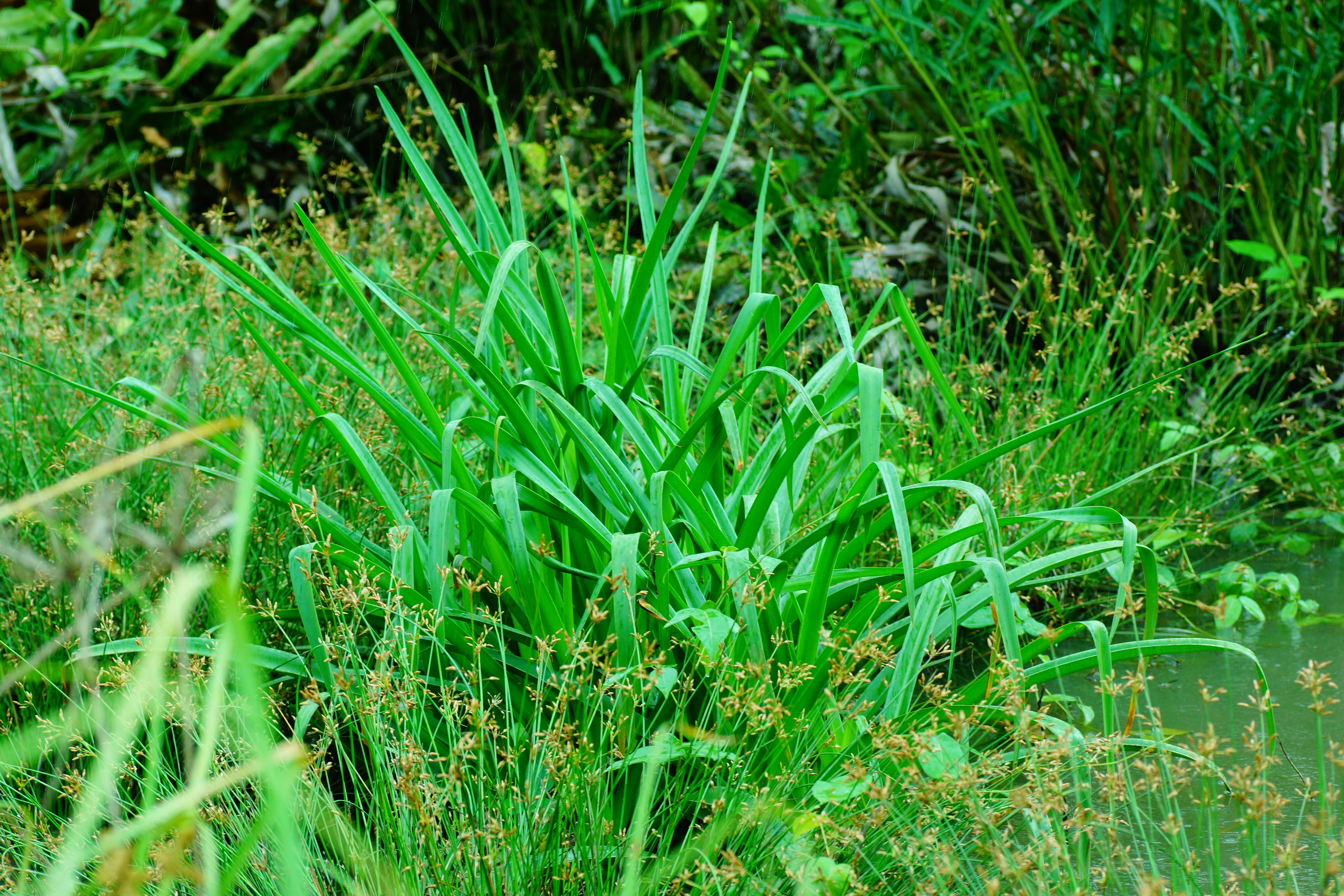

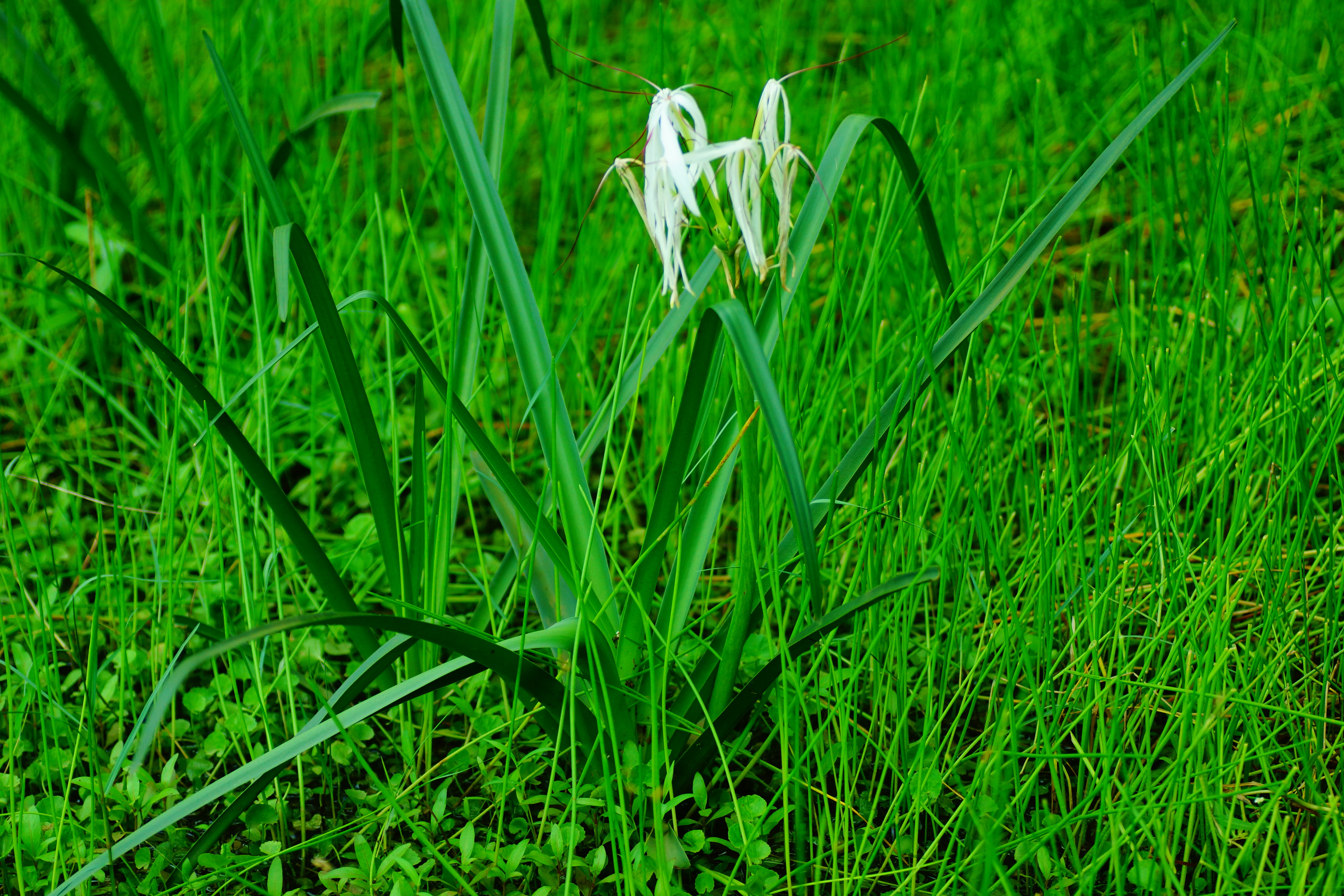

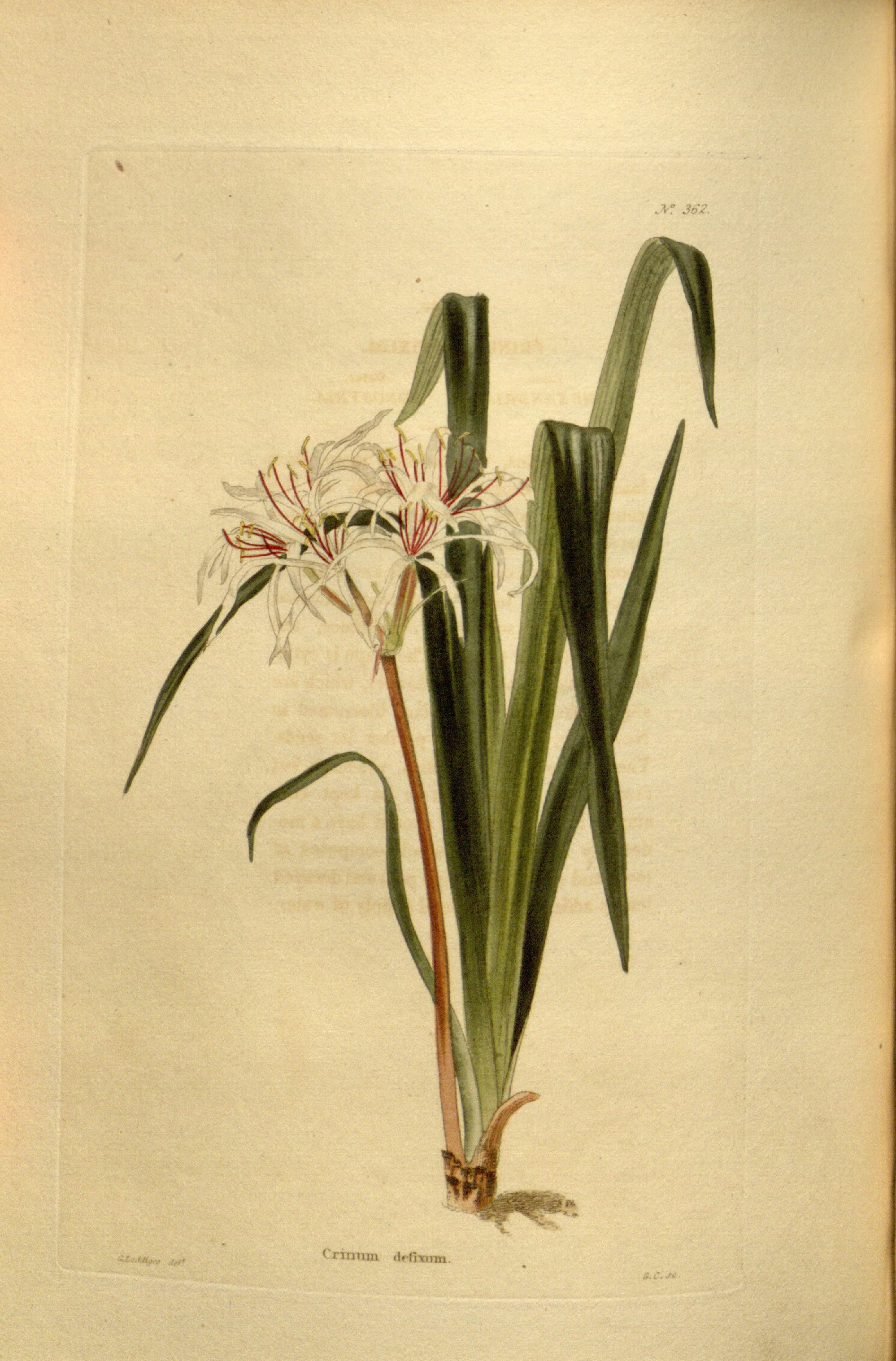

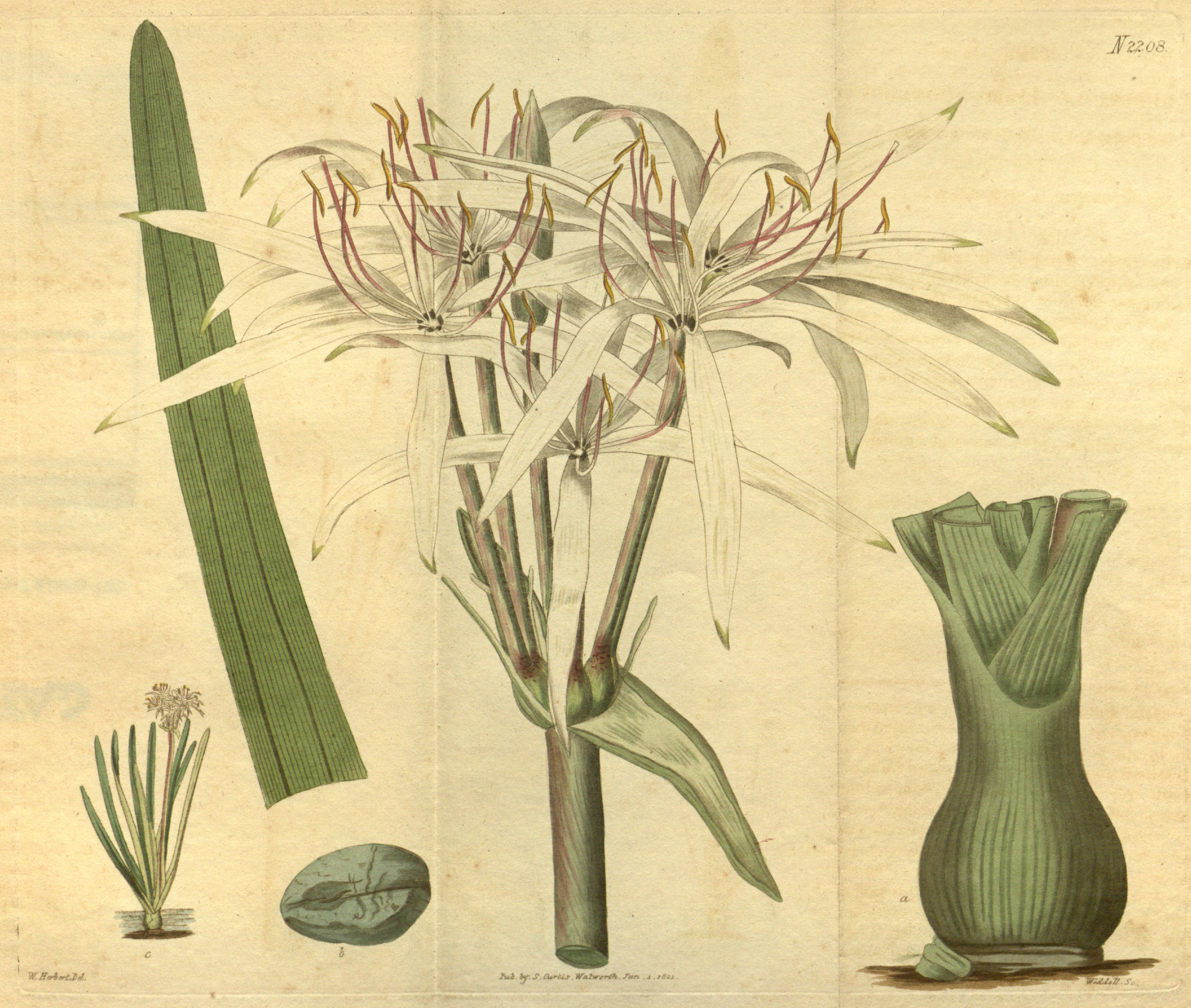

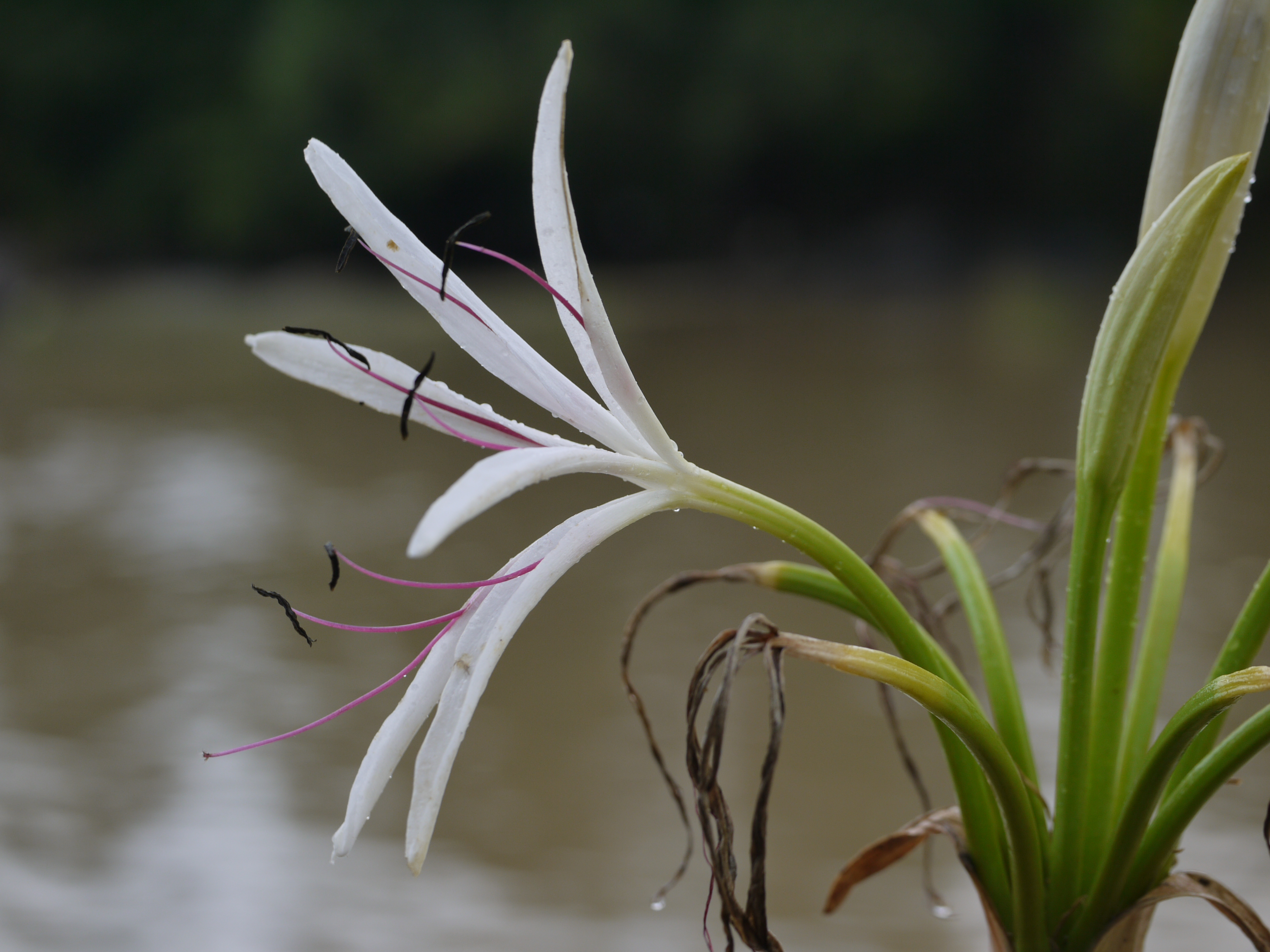

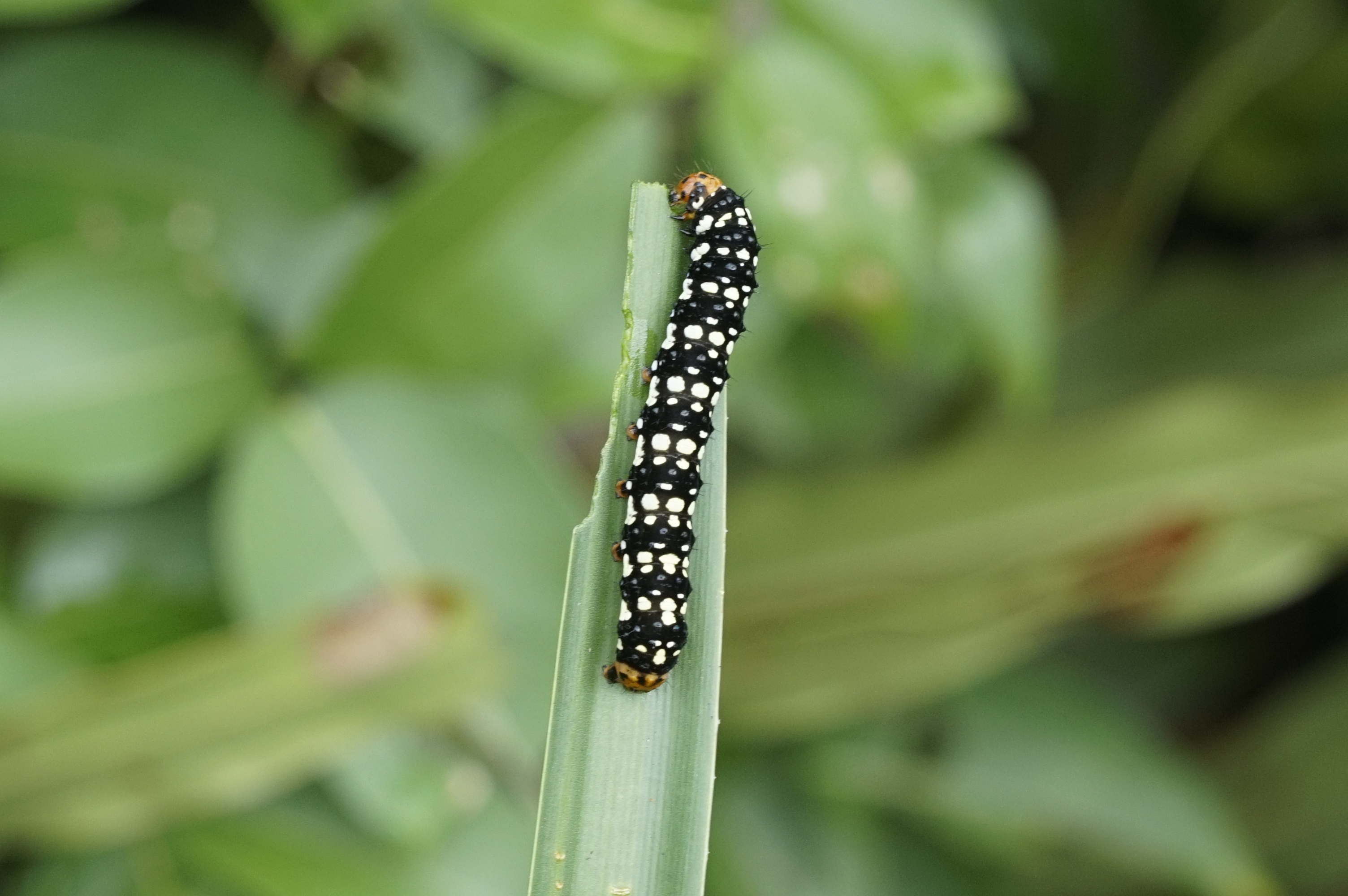
Polytela caterpillar (a Noctuid herbivore)
