= The Botanical Register =

British horticultural magazine (ran 1815–1847)

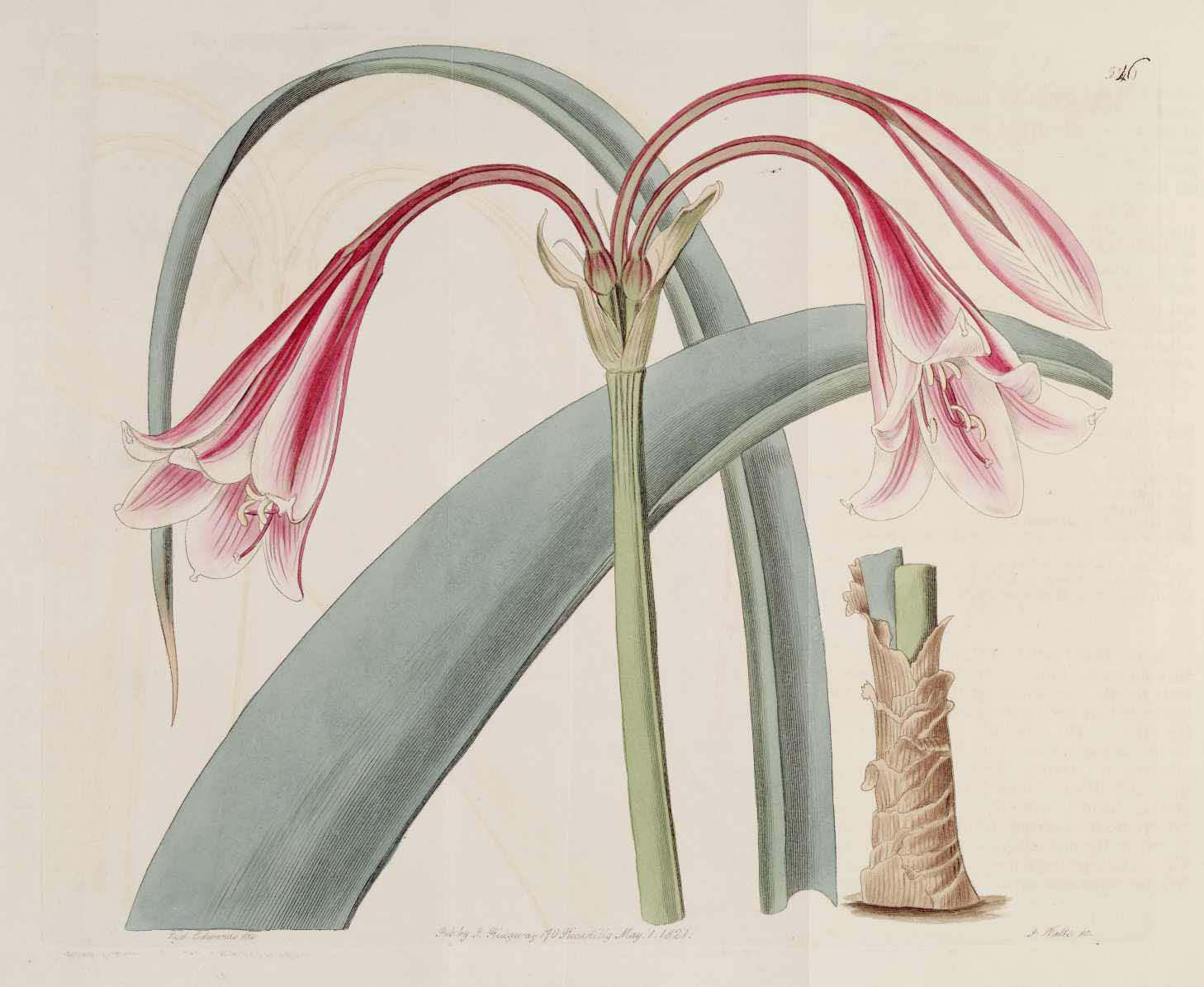
Crinum bulbispermum Plate 546

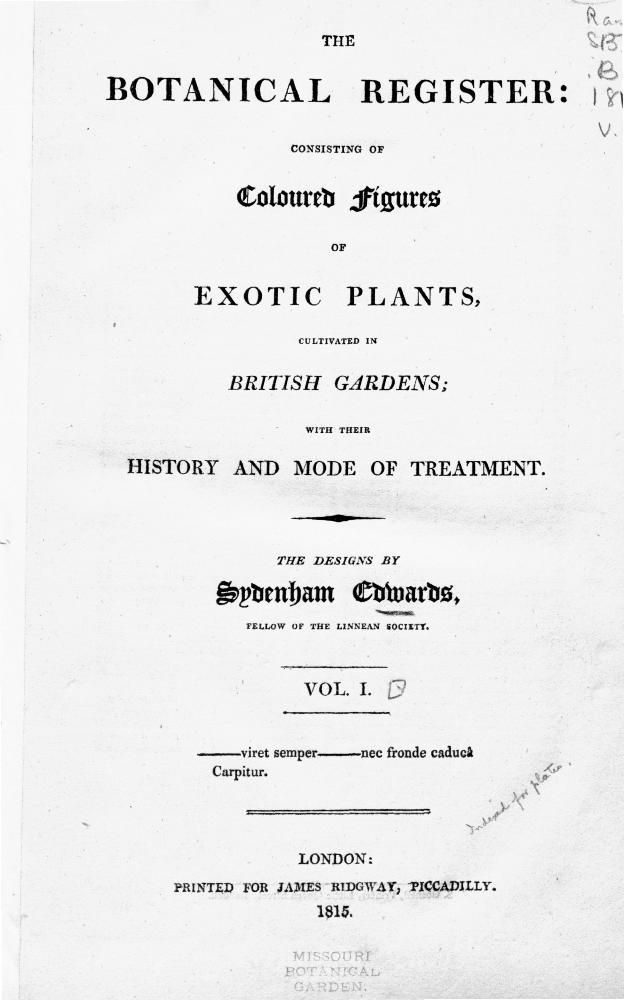
Frontispiece of Volume I

The Botanical Register, subsequently known as Edwards's Botanical Register, was an illustrated horticultural magazine that ran from 1815 to 1847. It was started by the botanical illustrator Sydenham Edwards, who had previously illustrated The Botanical Magazine, but left after a dispute with the editors. Edwards edited five volumes of The Botanical Register in five years, before his death in 1819. During this period, the text was provided by John Bellenden Ker Gawler, and Edwards himself provided paintings, which were engraved and hand-coloured by others.

After Edwards' death, editorial duties passed to the publisher, James Ridgway, who issued a further nine volumes between 1820 and 1828. In 1829, John Lindley was appointed editor, and he adopted the title Edwards's Botanical Register. A further nineteen volumes were issued before the magazine was discontinued in 1847. Sarah Drake contributed over 1000 illustrations to the magazine. In 1839, Lindley also issued an Appendix to the First Twenty-Three Volumes of Edwards's Botanical Register, which included his A Sketch of the Vegetation of the Swan River Colony.
