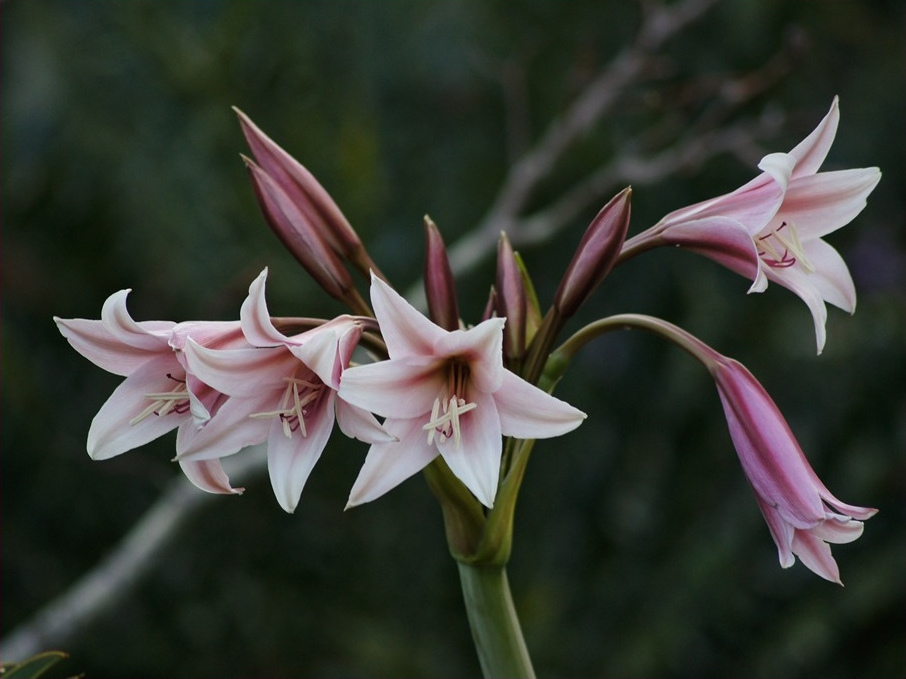

Scientific classification
- Kingdom: Plantae
- Clade: Tracheophytes
- Clade: Angiosperms
- Clade: Monocots
- Order: Asparagales
- Family: Amaryllidaceae
- Subfamily: Amaryllidoideae
- Genus: Crinum
- Species: C. bulbispermum

Binomial name
- Crinum bulbispermum (Burm.f.) Milne-Redh. & Schweick.

Synonyms
- Amaryllis bulbisperma Burm.f.; Amaryllis vivipara Lam.; Crinum viviparum R.Ansari & V.J.Nair; Amaryllis capensis Mill.; Amaryllis longifolia var. minor Ker Gawl.; Amaryllis longifolia var. riparia (Herb.) Ker Gawl.; Amaryllis longifolia var. rosea Tubergen; Amaryllis riparia Burch. ex Kunth; Crinum bulbispermum var. sanguineum Traub; Crinum capense Herb.; Crinum capense var. flore-albo Herb.; Crinum capense var. princeps Herb.; Crinum capense var. riparium Herb.; Crinum capense var. viridifolium Herb.; Crinum govenium Herb.; Crinum longifolium var. riparium Herb.; Crinum riparium (Herb.) Herb.; Crinum spofforthianum Herb. ex Sweet; Erigone govenica Salisb.

= Crinum bulbispermum =

Species of plant in the amaryllis family

Crinum bulbispermum is a herbaceous plant native to South Africa, Lesotho and Eswatini. It is naturalized in the Lesser Antilles, Honduras, Cuba, Florida, Texas, Louisiana, Alabama, South Carolina and North Carolina. Crinum bulbispermum is the floral emblem of the Free State province of South Africa.

== Description ==
The plant grows from large bulbs. It has strap shaped leaves, 50–88 cm (20–35 in) long. The inflorescence is an umbel with 8–13 flowers, borne on a scape 40–75 cm (16–30 in) tall. The flowers are funnel shaped and sickly-sweet scented, and are usually pink with a deep pink or red midstripe, but can range from white to red. Flowering takes place in spring and summer. The plant thrives in wet places.

== Cultivars and hybrids ==
There are some cultivars in cultivation:

- 'Alba' – pure white flowers.
- 'Backup Mother' – vigorous. Flowers medium pink with white throat.
- 'Spotty' – flowers rose-purple with odd random white spots and unpigmented, short stripes. Bred by Hannibal.

The species has also been used in a number of hybrids commonly cultivated.

- Crinum × herbertii G.Don ex Loud. (C. bulbispermum × C. scabrum)
- Crinum × powellii hort. ex Baker (C. bulbispermum × C. moorei) The most hardy of all Crinum species.

== Cultivation and uses ==
This is one of the most commonly cultivated species, grown as an ornamental plant for its flowers. It is best grown in deep soils that receive and hold a lot of water during the growing season and should be left to grow in the same place without disturbance for many years. Plants require full sun. They also make good container plants. The species is hardy to USDA zone 6 or −10 °C (14 °F) if the bulb is protected. Propagation is by division or seeds. Seedlings will flower in their third or fourth year.
