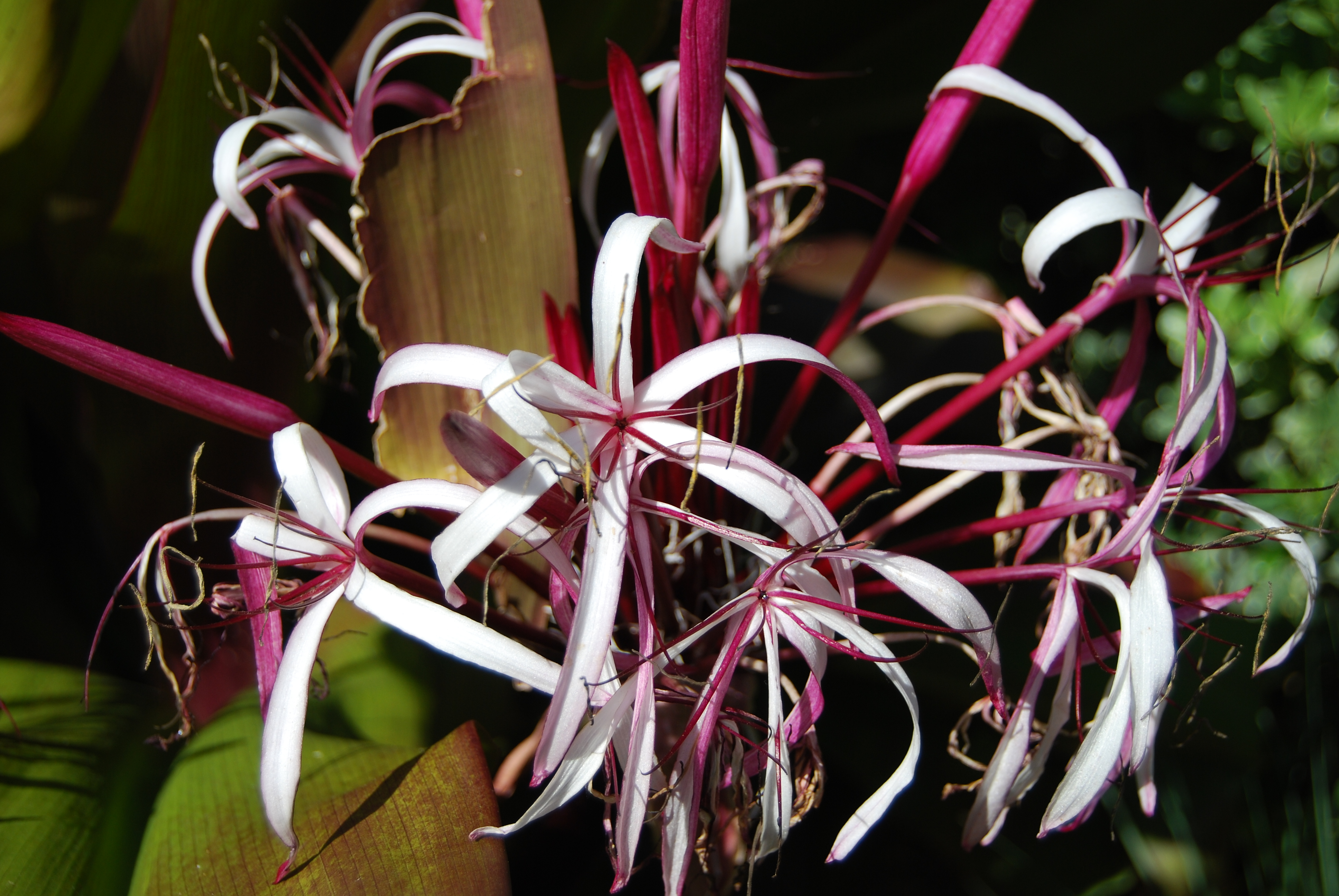
- Crinum asiaticum

Scientific classification
- Kingdom: Plantae
- Clade: Embryophytes
- Clade: Tracheophytes
- Clade: Angiosperms
- Clade: Monocots
- Order: Asparagales
- Family: Amaryllidaceae
- Subfamily: Amaryllidoideae
- Subtribe: Crininae
- Genus: Crinum; L.

Type species
- Crinum americanum L.

Species
- About 180 species, see text.

= Crinum =

Genus of plants in the amaryllis family

Crinum is a genus of about 180 species of perennial plants that have large showy flowers on leafless stems, and develop from bulbs. They are found in seasonally moist areas, including marshes, swamps, depressions and along the sides of streams and lakes in tropical and subtropical areas worldwide.

== Description ==
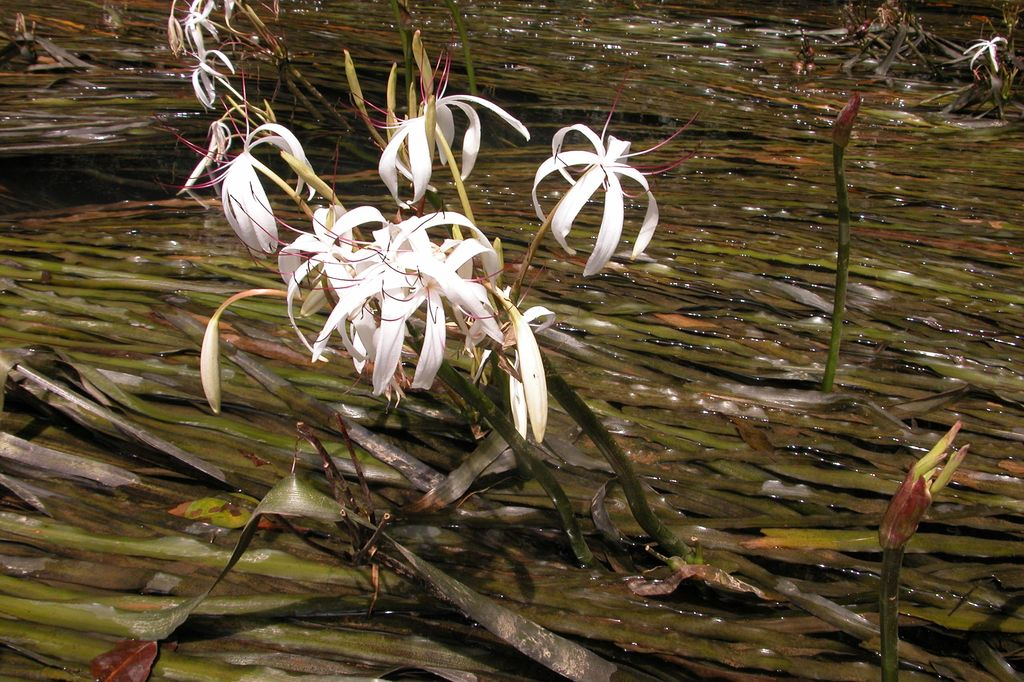
Crinum thaianum, an aquatic species from Thailand

=== Vegetative characteristics ===
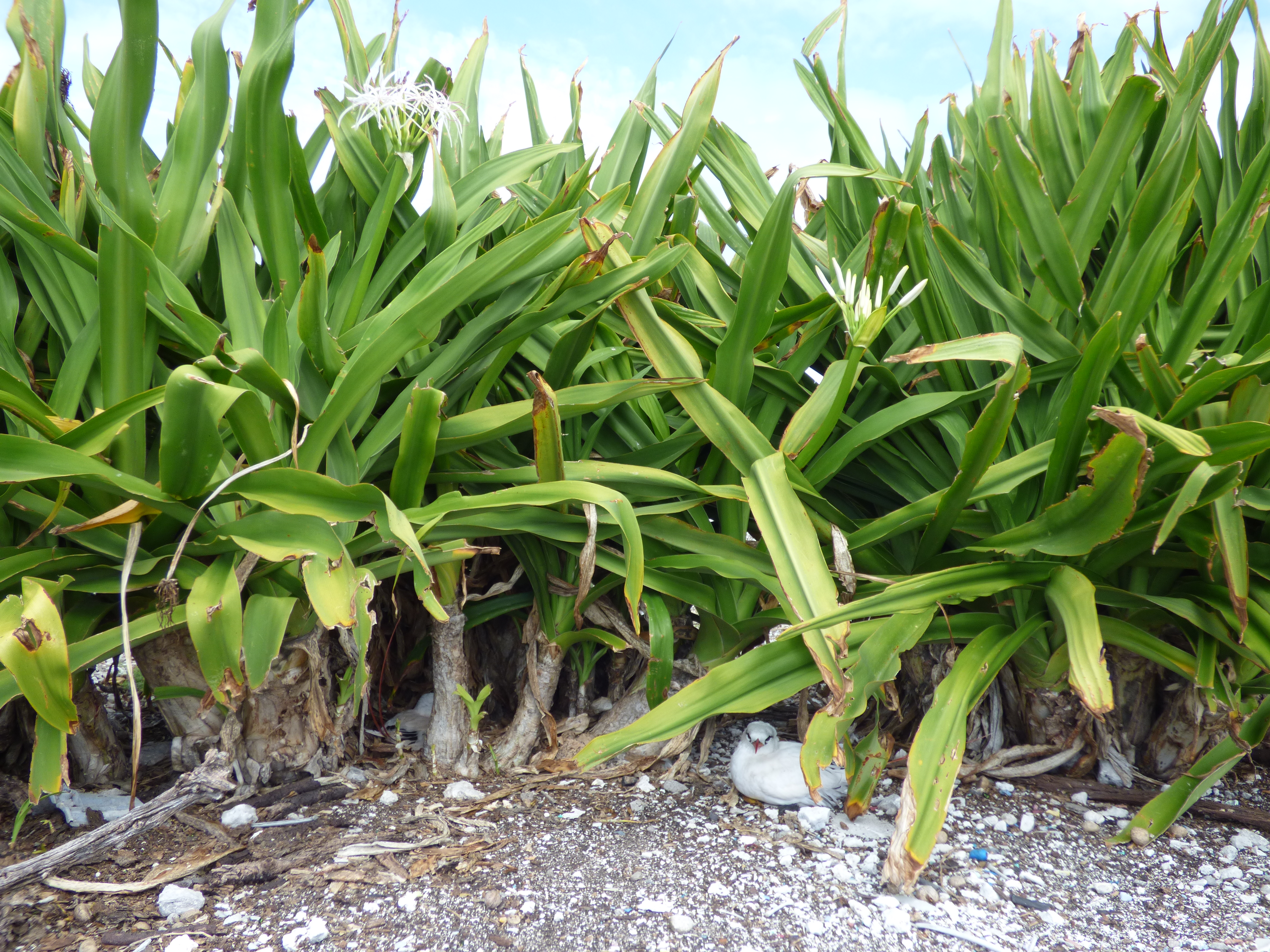
Large Crinum asiaticum growing as an invasive species in Hawaii

Crinum are bulbous perennial herbs with tunicate bulbs and basal, glabrous, annual to perennial leaves. These bulbs can be very large. A species which Chitendon and Synge list as Crinum crassipes (a synonym of Crinum variabile) can have a bulb 0.9 m (2 ft 11 in) high and 25 cm (9.8 in) thick., exceeded only by Worsleya procera.

=== Generative characteristics ===
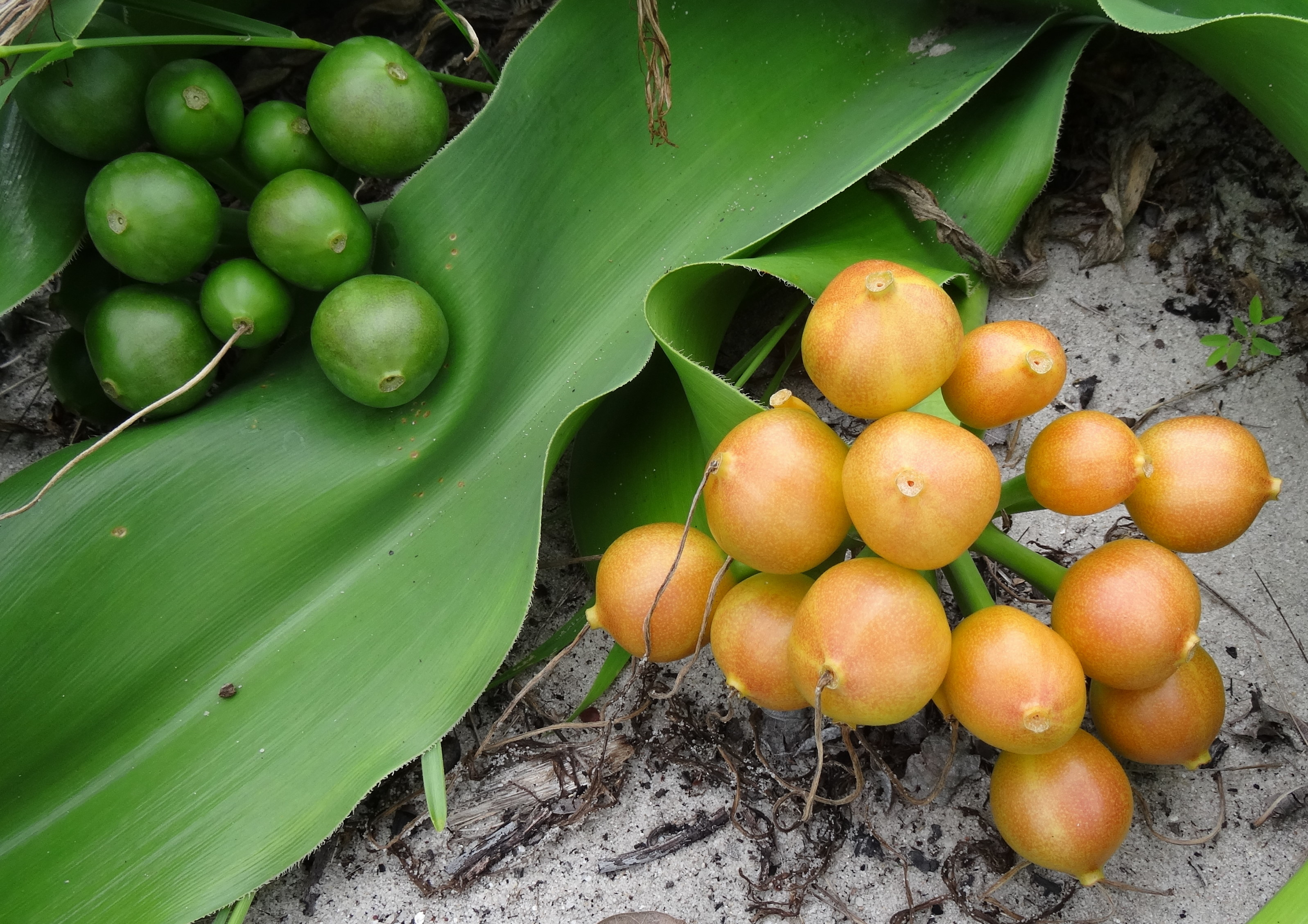
Crinum stuhlmannii infructescences

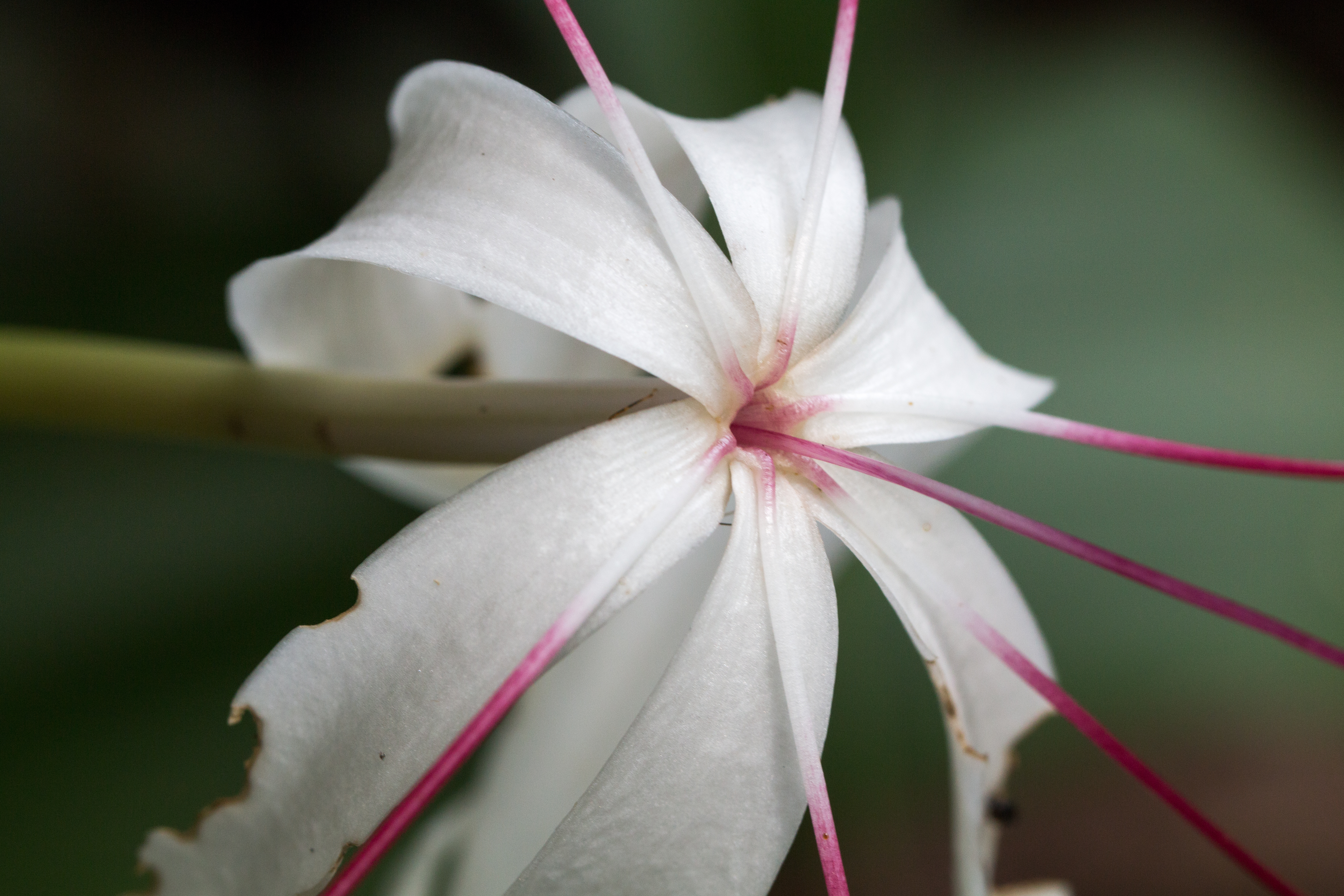
Detail of Crinum × amabile flower with stamens inserted at the throat of the perianth tube

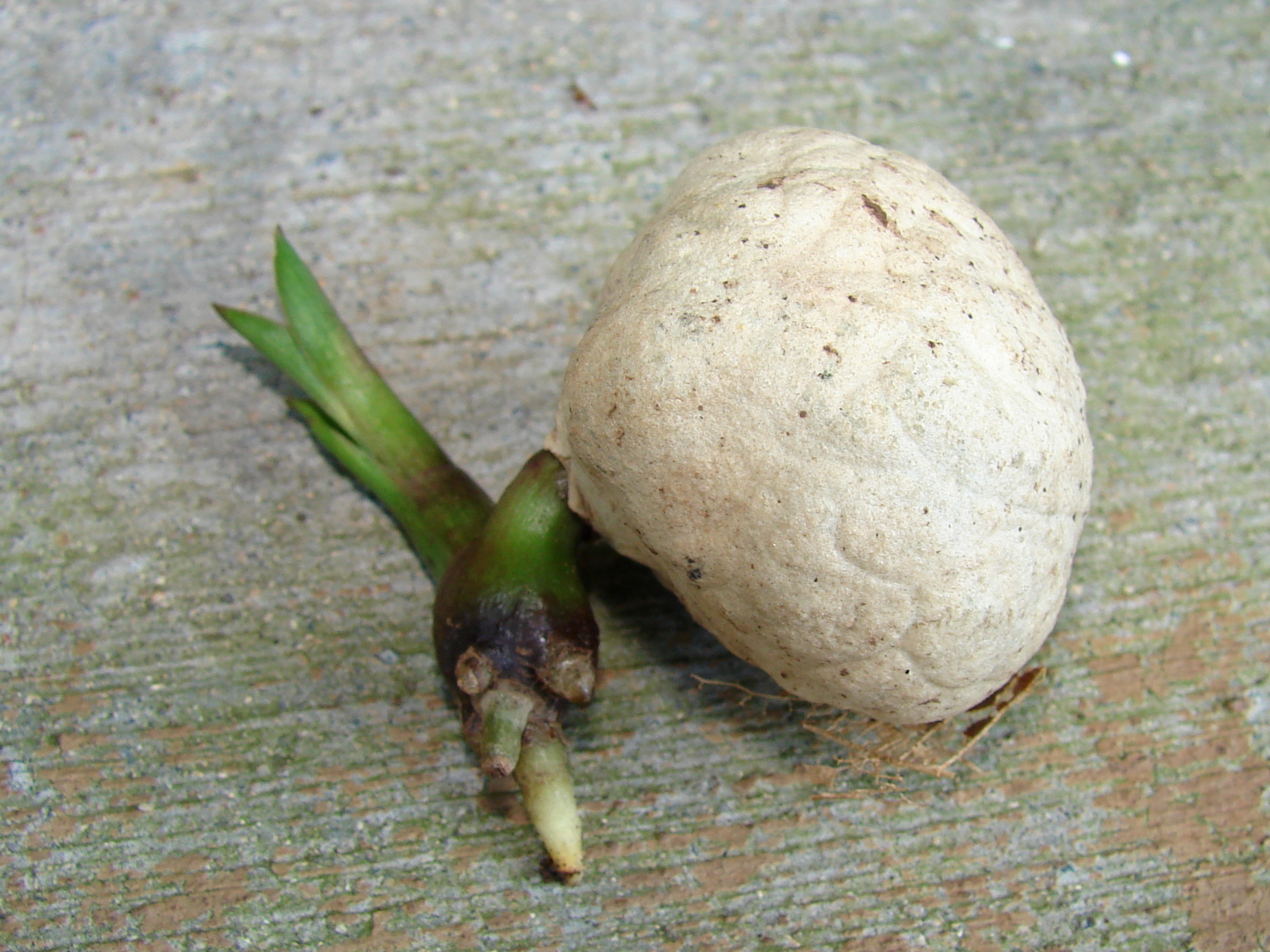
Germinating Crinum seed

The bisexual, sessile or pedicellate, zygomorphic or actinomorphic flowers are borne one umbellate or solitary inflorescences with solid scapes.

=== Cytology ===
Cytological studies have shown that 27 species of Crinum are diploid, having a typical chromosome count of 2n = 22. Abilio Fernandes found that the Orange River Crinum bulbispermum had a count of 2n = 66, and some desert Crinum macowanii 2n = 44. These polyploid species produce seeds that are often parthenogenetic triploid or diploids, lack vigour and seldom grow to mature plants.

== Taxonomy ==
It was published by Carl Linnaeus in 1753. The lectotype Crinum americanum L. was designated in 1923.

=== Species ===
As of July 2014, the World Checklist of Selected Plant Families lists 105 species of Crinum. Amongst these are:

- Crinum americanum L. – southern swamplily, seven sisters
- Crinum asiaticum L. – poisonbulb
- Crinum bulbispermum (Burm.f.) Milne-Redh. & Schweick. – hardy swamplily
- Crinum latifolium L.
- Crinum macowanii Baker
- Crinum moorei Hook.f.
- Crinum pedunculatum R.Br., syn. C. asiaticum var. pedunculatum – swamplily, river lily or spider lily
- Crinum thaianum Schulze – onion plant
- Crinum viviparum (Lam.) R.Ansari & V.J.Nair – Indian Subcontinent to Indo-China

=== Formerly placed here ===
- Agapanthus africanus (L.) Hoffmanns. (as C. africanum L.)
- Ammocharis heterostyla (Bullock) Milne-Redh. & Schweick. (as C. heterostylum Bullock)
- Cyrtanthus angustifolius (L.f.) Aiton (as C. angustifolius L.f.)
- Cyrtanthus elatus (Jacq.) Traub (as C. speciosum L.f.)
- Cyrtanthus obliquus (L.f.) Aiton (as C. obliquum L.f.)
- Hippeastrum argentinum (Pax) Hunz. (as C. argentinum Pax)
- Urceolina urceolata (Ruiz & Pav.) Asch. & Graebn. (as C. urceolatum Ruiz & Pav.)

=== Hybrids ===
- × Amarcrinum hybridised with Amaryllis
- C. × powellii (garden hybrid between C. bulbispermum and C. moorei) - pale pink, fragrant, lily-like flowers produced in late summer
  - C. × powellii 'Album' (white flowered cultivar)

=== Etymology ===
The generic name Crinum comes from the Ancient Greek κρίνον (krinon), meaning lily, via the Latin crinum.

== Uses ==
Several species are used in aquariums and in aquascaping. These include Crinum calamistratum, Crinum malabaricum, Crinum natans, and Crinum thaianum.

== Gallery ==
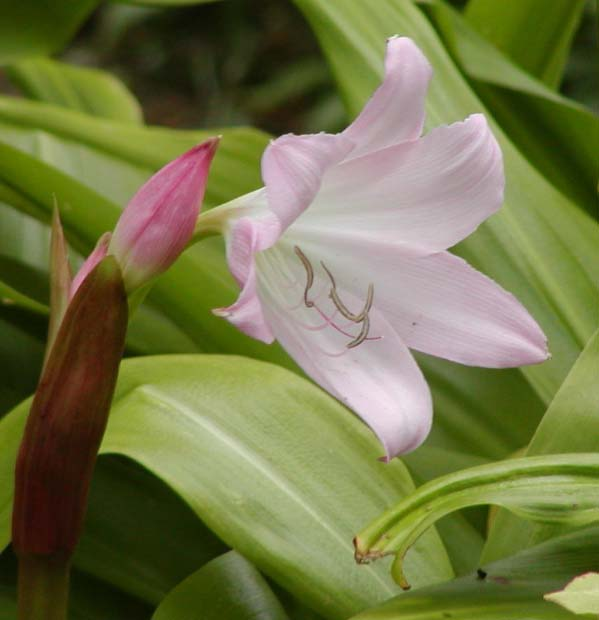
Crinum moorei

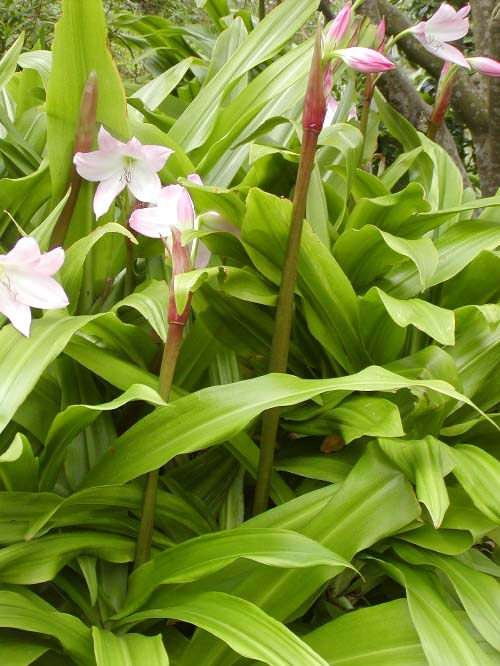
Crinum moorei at Strybing Arboretum, San Francisco

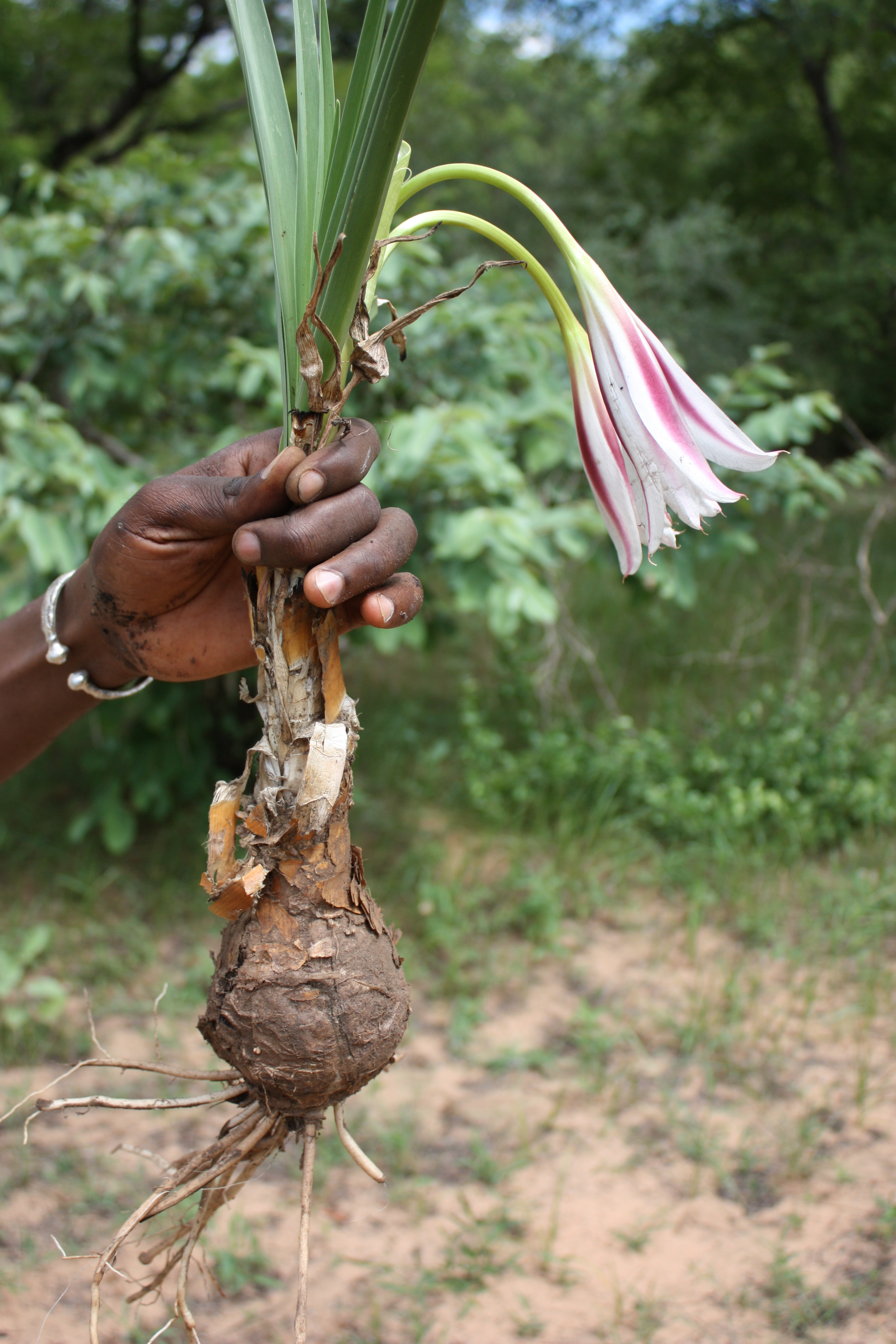
Crinum ornatum, SW Burkina Faso

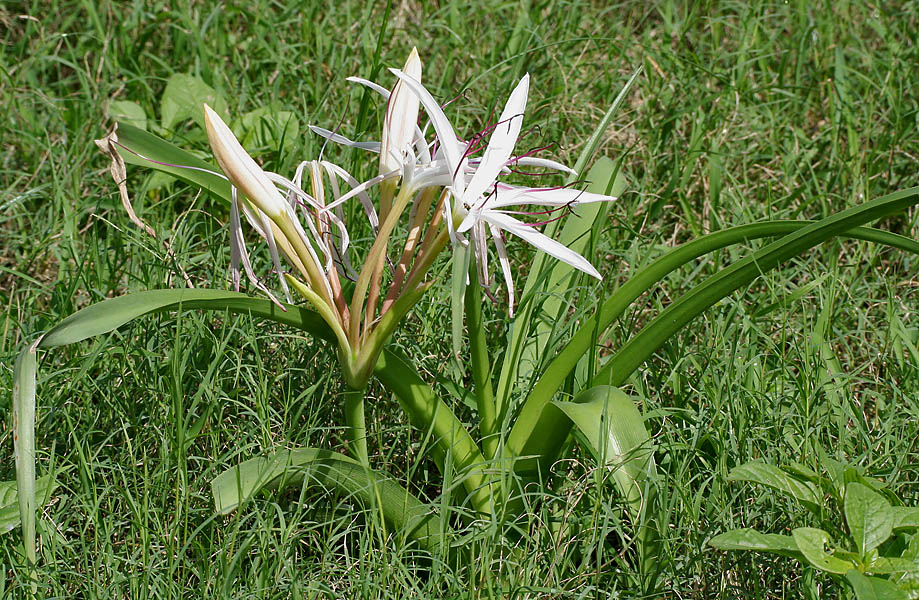
Crinum species in Hyderabad, India

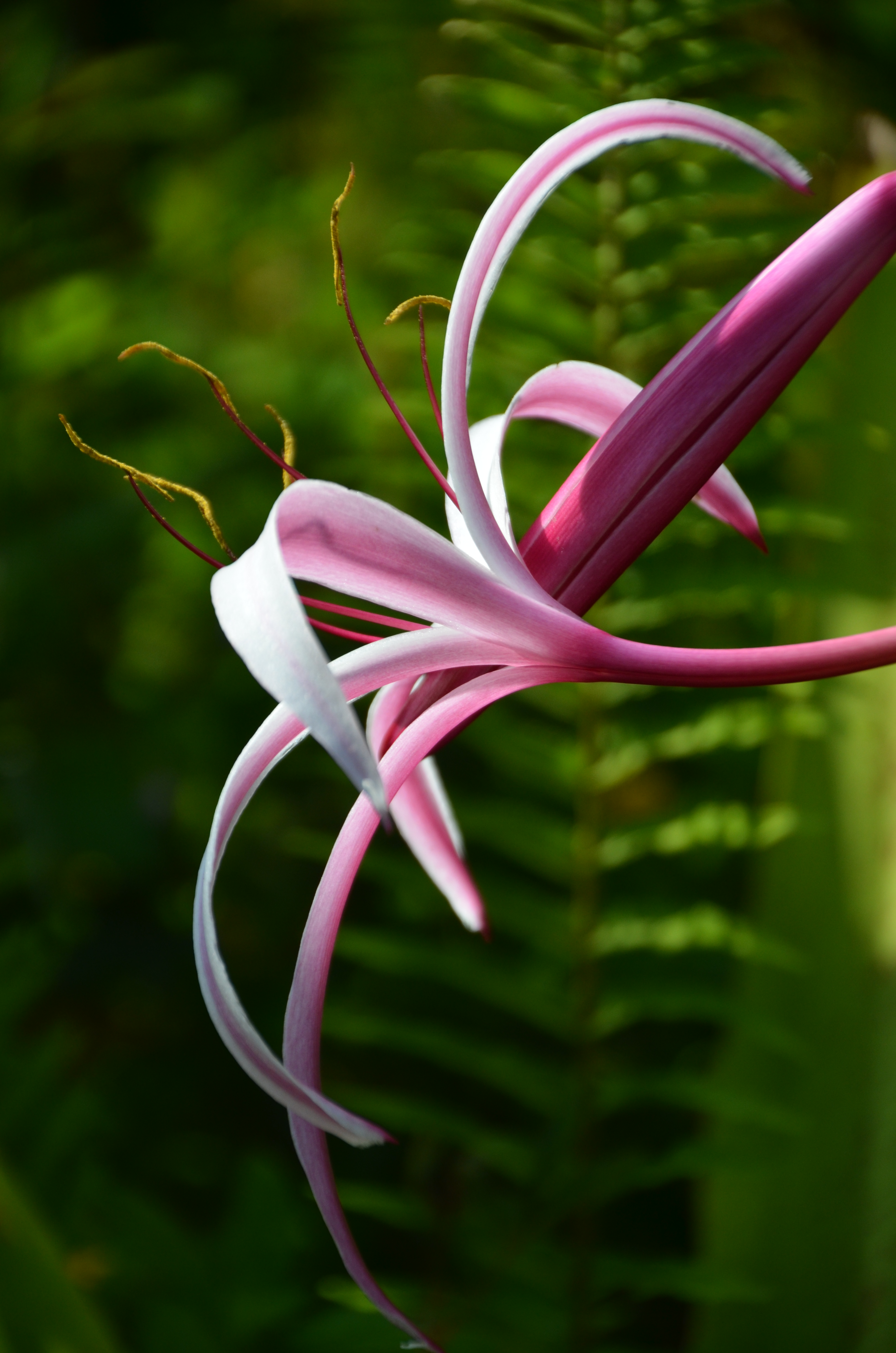
Queen Emma lily (Crinum augustum or Crinum amabile var. augustum) in Hawaiʻi

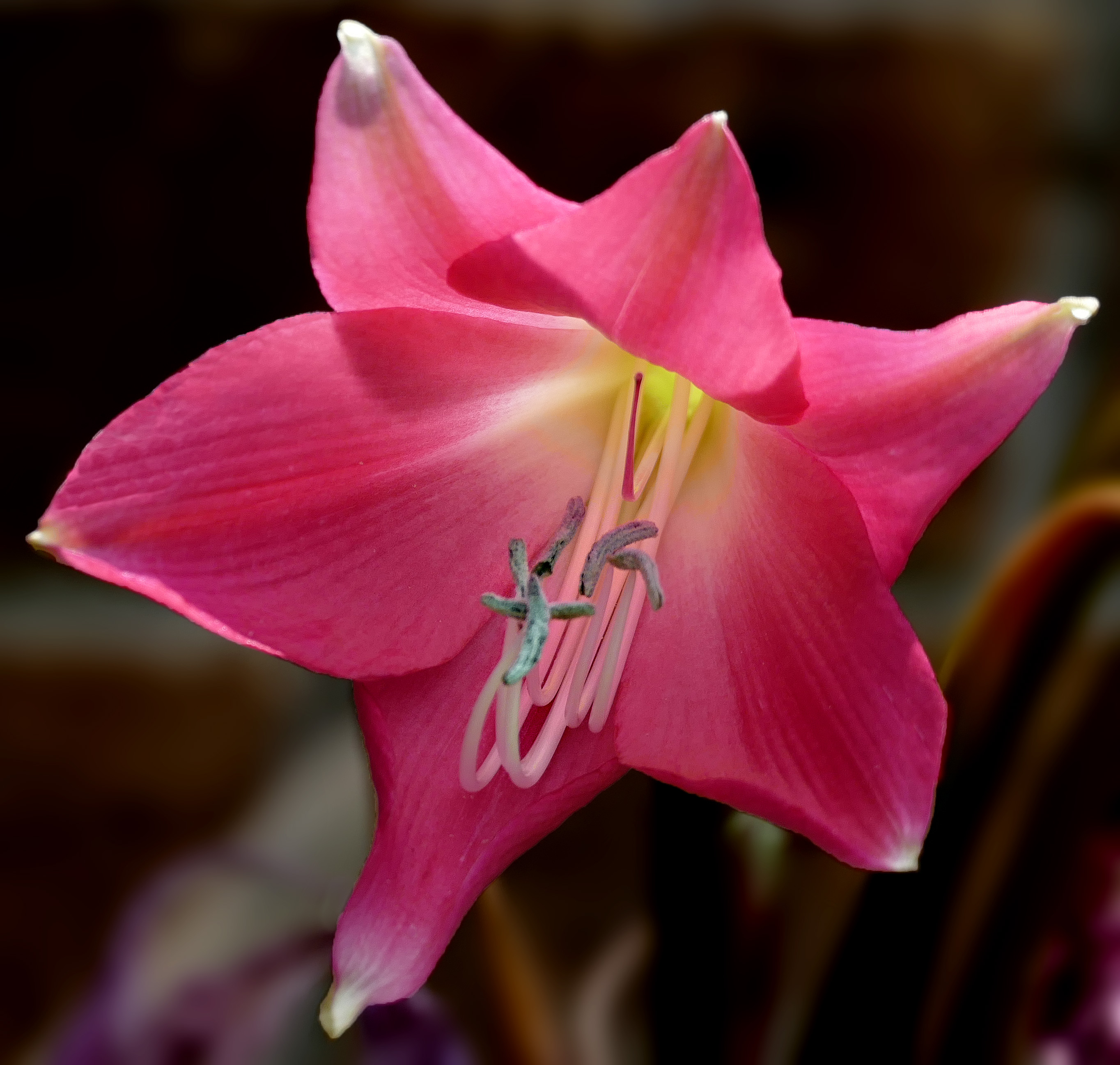
Crinum 'Ellen Bosanquet'

== See also ==
- List of plants known as lily

== Bibliography ==
- Germishuizen, G.; Meyer, N.L., eds. (2003). "Plants of Southern Africa: an annotated checklist" (PDF). Strelitzia. 14 (i–vi): 1–1231. Archived from the original (PDF) on 2011-06-27. (online version)
