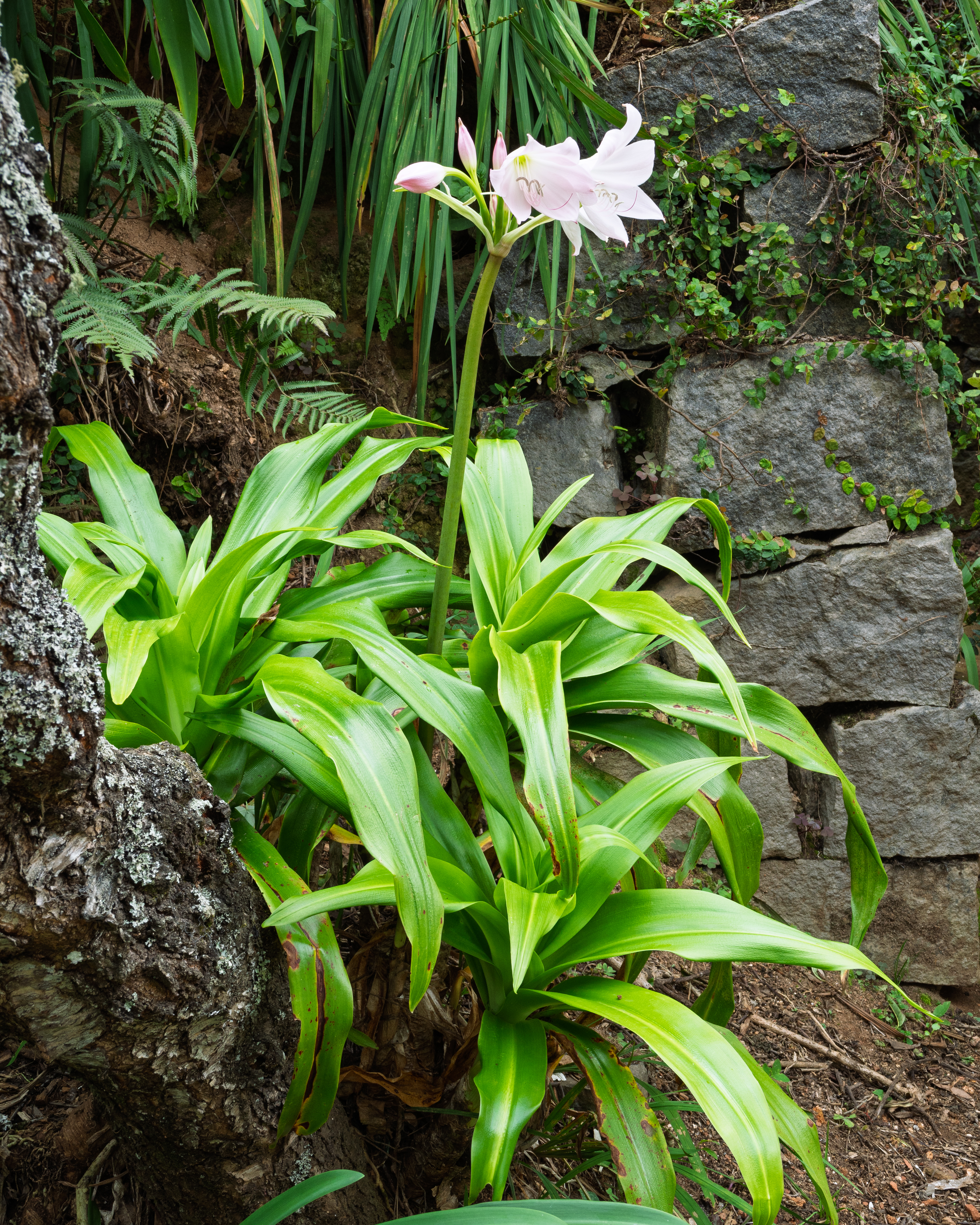
- Crinum moorei

Conservation status
- Vulnerable (SANBI Red List)

Scientific classification
- Kingdom: Plantae
- Clade: Tracheophytes
- Clade: Angiosperms
- Clade: Monocots
- Order: Asparagales
- Family: Amaryllidaceae
- Subfamily: Amaryllidoideae
- Genus: Crinum
- Species: C. moorei

Binomial name
- Crinum moorei Hook.f.

Synonyms
- Amaryllis moorei (Hook.f.) Stapf; Crinum colensoi Baker; Crinum makoyanum Carrière

= Crinum moorei =

Species of flowering plant

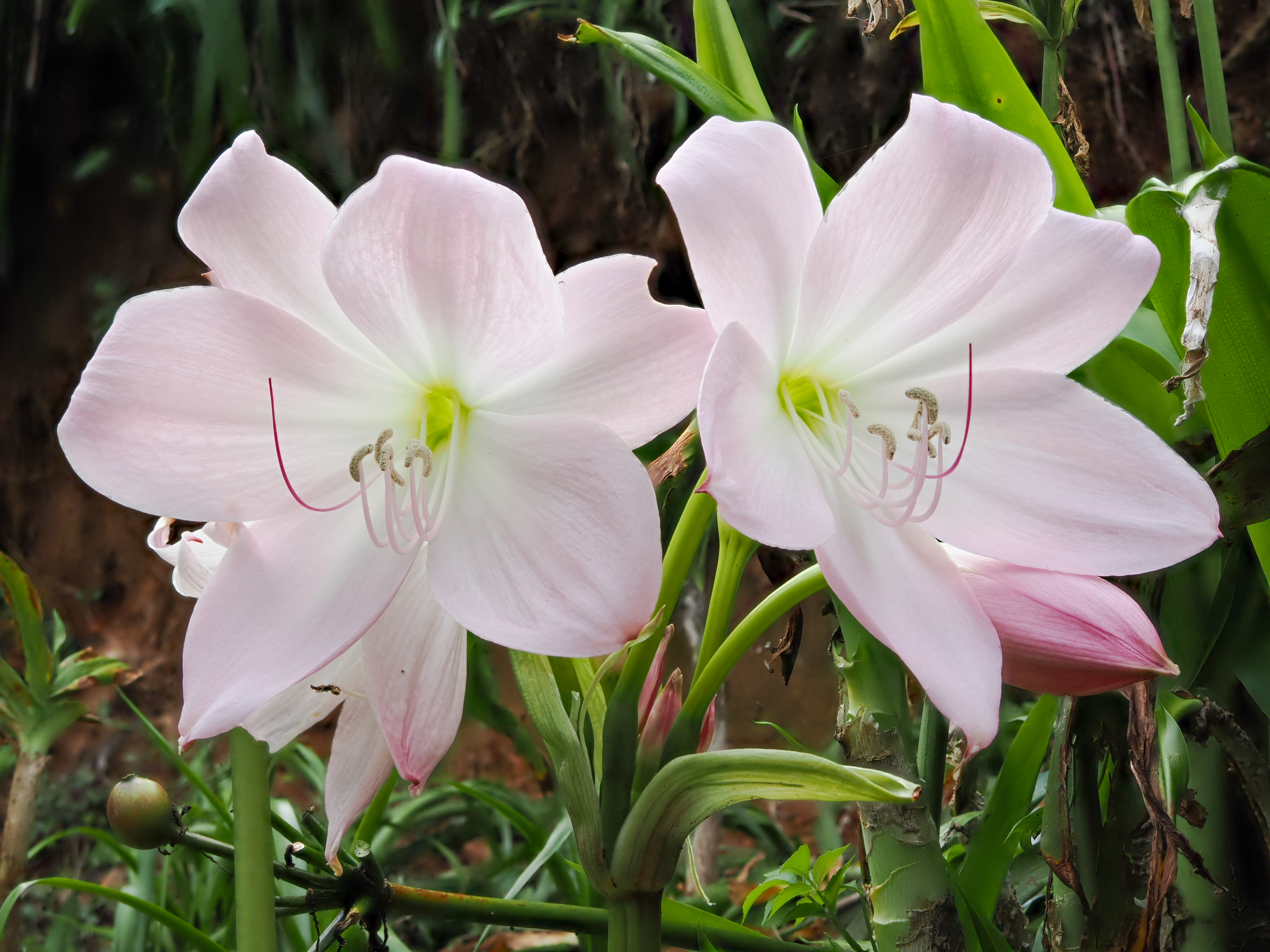
Crinum moorei flowers, Ooty, India

Crinum moorei is a herbaceous plant belonging to the family Amaryllidaceae, and native to South Africa (the Cape Provinces and KwaZulu-Natal). While it is declining in the wild, it has been introduced in several countries in the Americas and Asia.

== Description ==
The Natal lily is a herbaceous perennial about 0.3–1.6 m (0.98–5.25 ft)tall. It is one of the larger members of the tropical-temperate lily family Amaryllidaceae. It grows from a bulb up to 20 cm (7.9 in) diameter just under the surface of the soil. The bulbs propagate by multiplying from the base. A long neck projects 20–30 cm (7.9–11.8 in) above the surface. This is topped by a rosette of long, flat, green leaves, about 0.65–1.5 m (2.1–4.9 ft) long and 6–12 cm (2.4–4.7 in) wide.

Buds vertical, mature flowers drooping

Filaments with anthers (left), style (right)

A cluster of 5-10 white to pale pink flowers form on top of a stalk that is up to 1.2 m (3.9 ft) tall. The strongly-scented flowers are funnel shaped. The petals are about 8–10 cm (3.1–3.9 in) long, 2.4–4 cm (0.94–1.57 in) wide. The buds are initially vertical and droop as the flower matures. The filament curves downwards, and then upwards at the tip. The style is red towards the top end.

== Taxonomy ==
In the 1860s, Webb, a British soldier, collected seeds of the lily from KwaZulu-Natal. He gave these to Dr. D. Moore, Director of the Glasnevin Botanical Gardens, Dublin. Sir Joseph Dalton Hooker who described the species, named it for Dr. Moore. The genus name Crinum comes from the Greek krinon meaning lily.

Crinum moorei belongs to the family Amaryllidaceae.

=== Synonyms ===
- Homotypic
  - Amaryllis moorei (Hook.f.)
- Heterotypic
  - Crinum imbricatum Baker
  - Crinum colensoi Baker
  - Crinum mackenii Baker
  - Crinum makoyanum Carrière
  - Crinum moorei var. album hort.
  - Crinum moorei var. platypetala hort.
  - Crinum moorei var. rubra Hannibal
  - Crinum natalense Baker
  - Crinum schmidtii Regel

=== Hybrids ===
- Crinum × powellii Baker
- Crinum × worsleyi W.Watson

== Distribution ==
Crinum moorei is native to Cape Provinces and KwaZulu-Natal in South Africa. It has been introduced in Peru, Ecuador, Mexico and Korea. It is grown in the Nilgiris and Idukki in the Western Ghats of South India.

== Ecology ==
Crinum moorei thrives in damp, marshy loam soil in the shade. The flower scent is reported to be stronger in the evening, perhaps to attract pollinators during that time.

== Conservation ==
According to the Red List of South African Plants, Crinum moorei is Vulnerable, the wild population having declined by 20% over the past 70 years. This is due to harvesting of bulbs for traditional medicine, and infestations by pests.

== Uses ==
Crinum moorei is used in traditional medicine for urinary tract and skin infections, and cleansing the blood. It is also used for treating cattle.

Recently, Crinum moorei has been used in the modern field of nanotechnology. Researchers used extracts from leaves and roots of 15 species of Indian Crinum for synthesis on silver nanoparticles. They found the roots of Crinum moorei to be most effective among these.

== Gallery ==
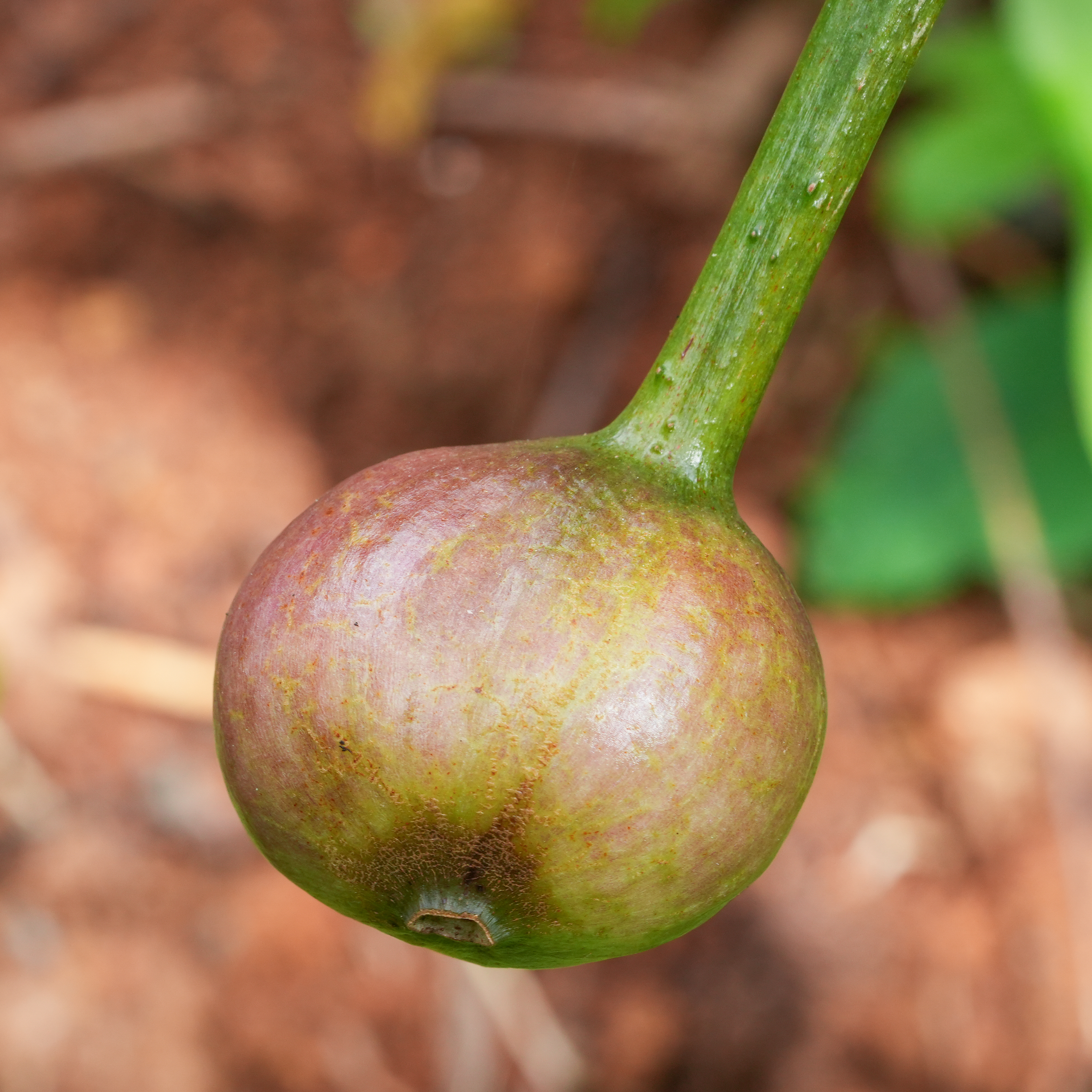
Bulbil on stalk

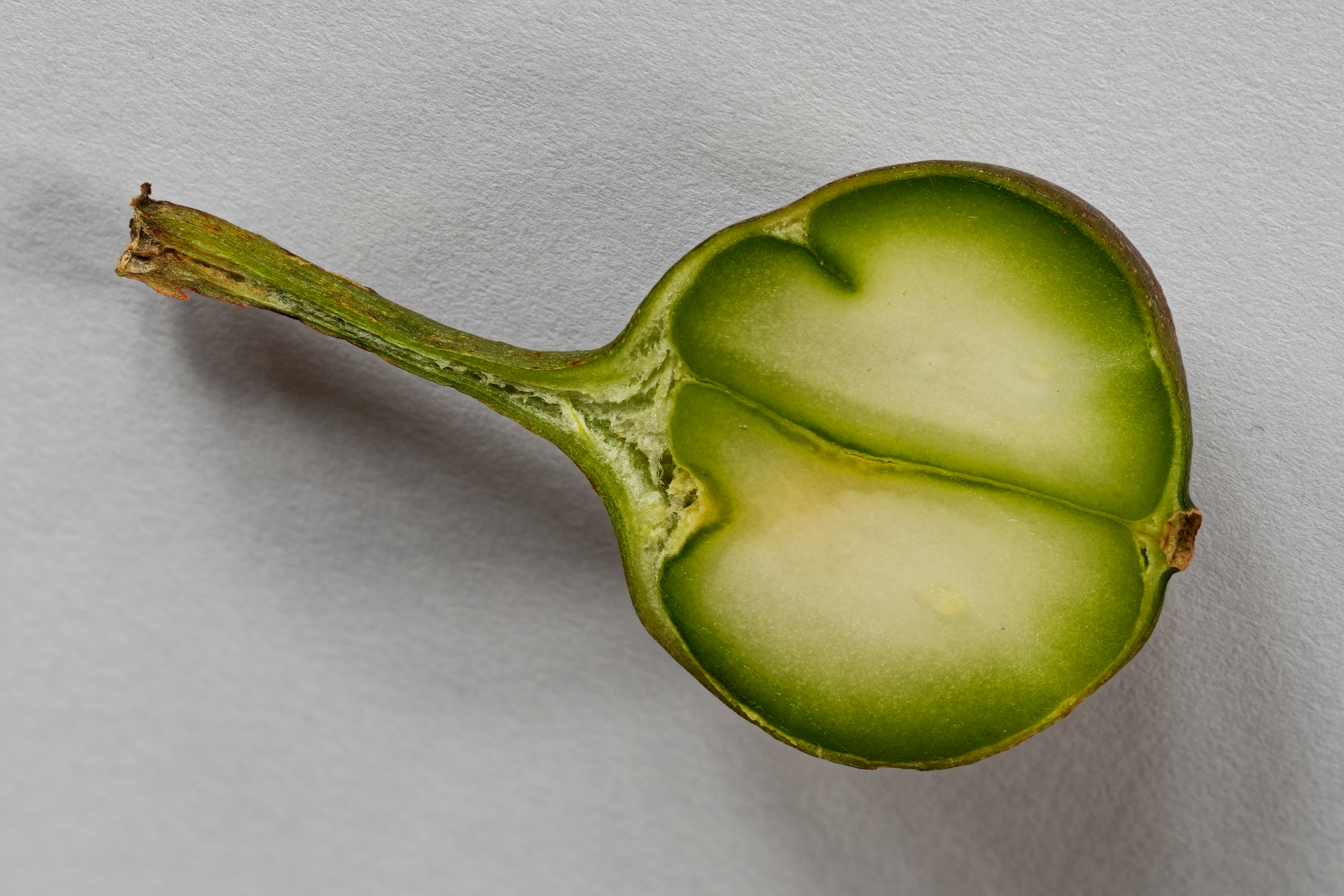
Cross-section of bulbil

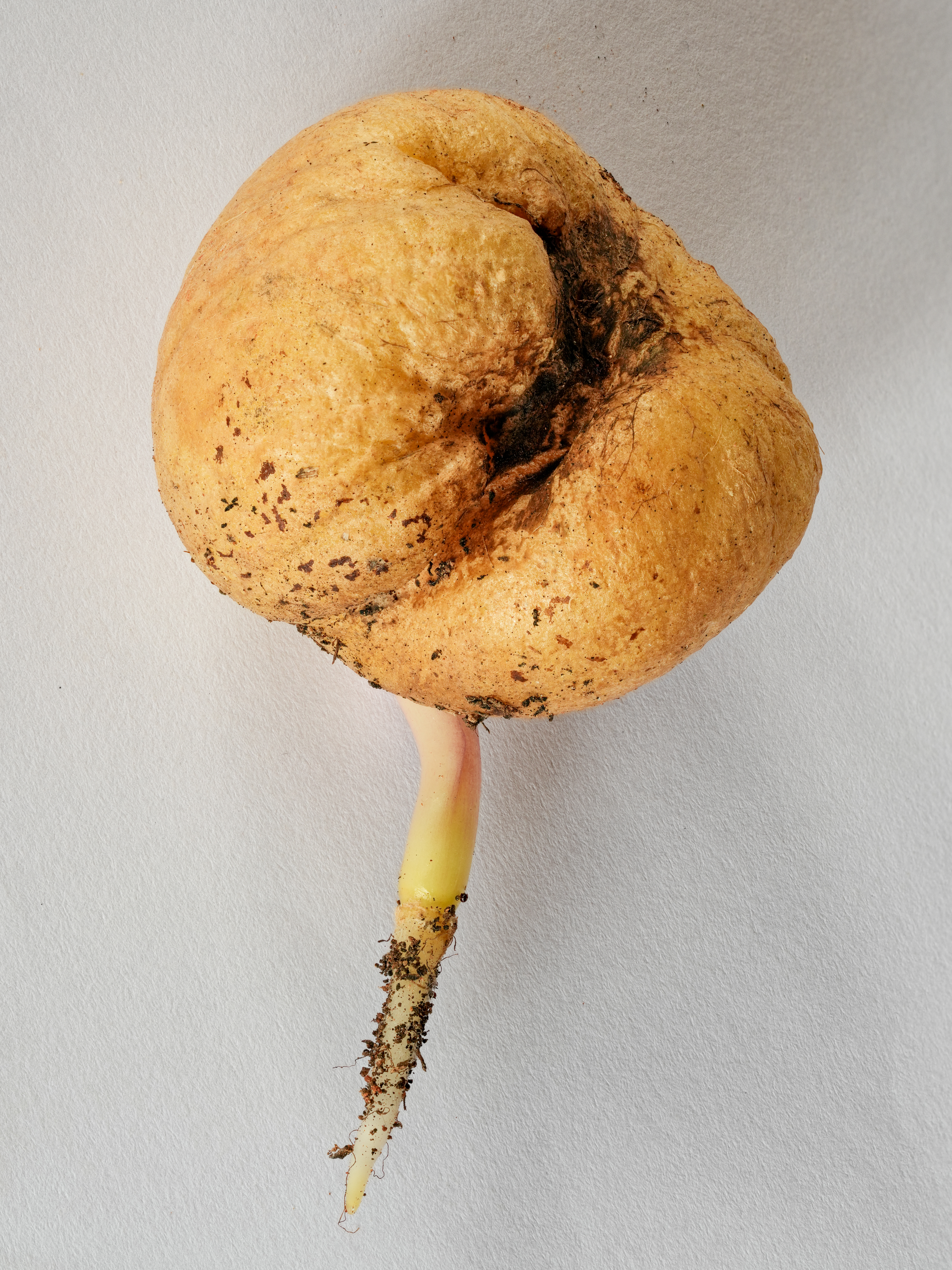
Germinating bulbil with radicle

Stamen with pollen

Old stamen without pollen

Pollen grains, each ~0.1 mm (0.0039 in)
