= Meta noise (disambiguation) =

Meta noise refers to inaccurate or irrelevant Metadata recorded in a computerised data repository.

Meta noise may also refer to:

- Meta noise (Metadata tag), a Metadata tag to encapsulate or describe an audio event

== See also ==
- Noise (disambiguation)
