= Noisy =

Noisy is an adjective meaning something or somewhere is full of noise, or unwanted sound. It may also refer to:

== Communes in France ==
- Noisy-le-Grand in the Seine-Saint-Denis département
- Noisy-le-Roi in the Yvelines département
- Noisy-le-Sec in the Seine-Saint-Denis département
- Noisy-Rudignon in the Seine-et-Marne département
- Noisy-sur-École in the Seine-et-Marne département
- Noisy-sur-Oise in the Val-d'Oise département

== Taxonic names ==
  - noisy friarbird (Philemon corniculatus), a passerine bird of the honeyeater family.
  - noisy frog (Microhyla butleri) or painted chorus frog
  - noisy miner (Manorina melanocephala), a bird in the honeyeater family
  - noisy pitta (Pitta versicolor), a bird found in eastern Australia and southern New Guinea.
  - noisy scrubbird (Atrichornis clamosus), a bird endemic to the coastal heaths of south-western Australia.

== Other uses ==
- Mr. Noisy, a character from the children's book Mr. Men.
- Geirmund the Noisy from the Icelandic Laxdæla saga.
- Noisy Lake in Custer County, Idaho, United States.

== See also ==
- Noise (disambiguation)
