= Noise level =

The noise level is the level of noise. Specifically, it may refer to:

- Noise (electronics)
- Noise (signal processing)
- Ambient noise level
- Environmental noise

== See also ==
- Noise pollution
- Sound pressure level
