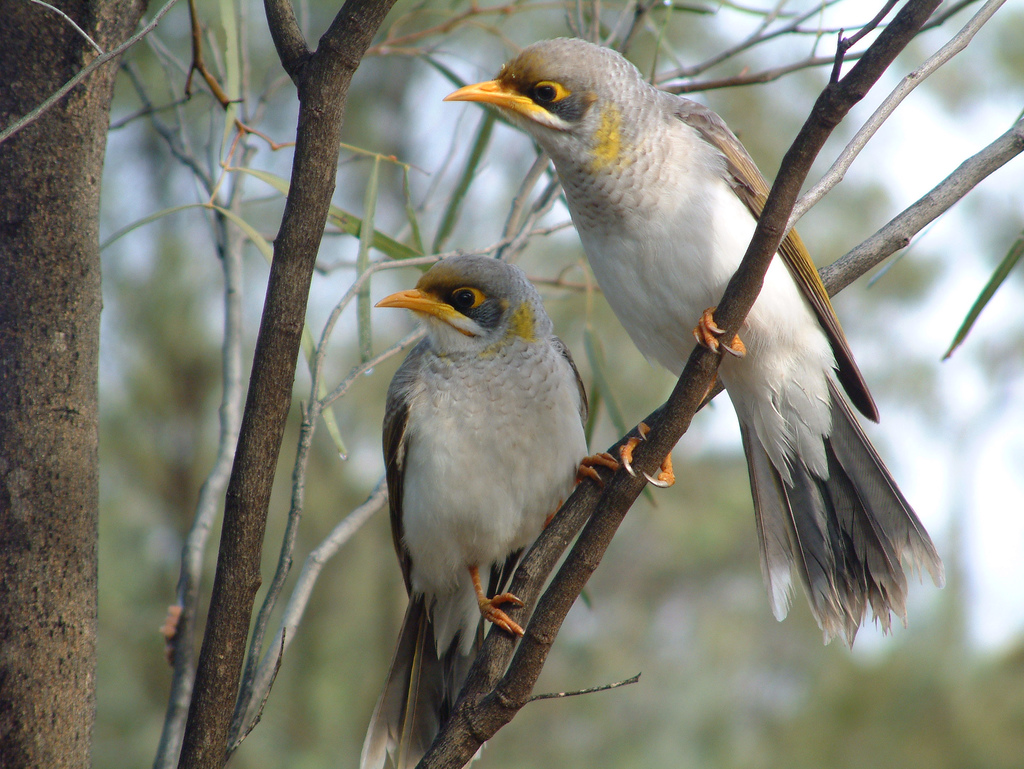
- Yellow-throated miner (Manorina flavigula)

Scientific classification
- Kingdom: Animalia
- Phylum: Chordata
- Class: Aves
- Order: Passeriformes
- Family: Meliphagidae
- Genus: Manorina; Vieillot, 1818

Type species
- Manorina viridis Vieillot, 1818

= Manorina =

Genus of birds

Manorina is a genus of Australian endemic honeyeaters, containing four species: the black-eared miner (M. melanotis) the yellow-throated miner (M. flavigula), the noisy miner (M. melanocephala) and the bell miner (M. melanophrys). The genus is notable for the complex social organisation of its species, which live in colonies that can be further subdivided into coteries and nest contingents.

== Description ==
The four species are stockily built honeyeaters with rounded wings and yellow bills. One of their most obvious characteristics is a patch of bare yellow skin behind the eyes, which gives them an odd 'cross-eyed' look. They are predominantly insectivorous and feed by gleaning. Their nests sit on other structures (such as tree branches) rather than hang down.

== Taxonomy ==
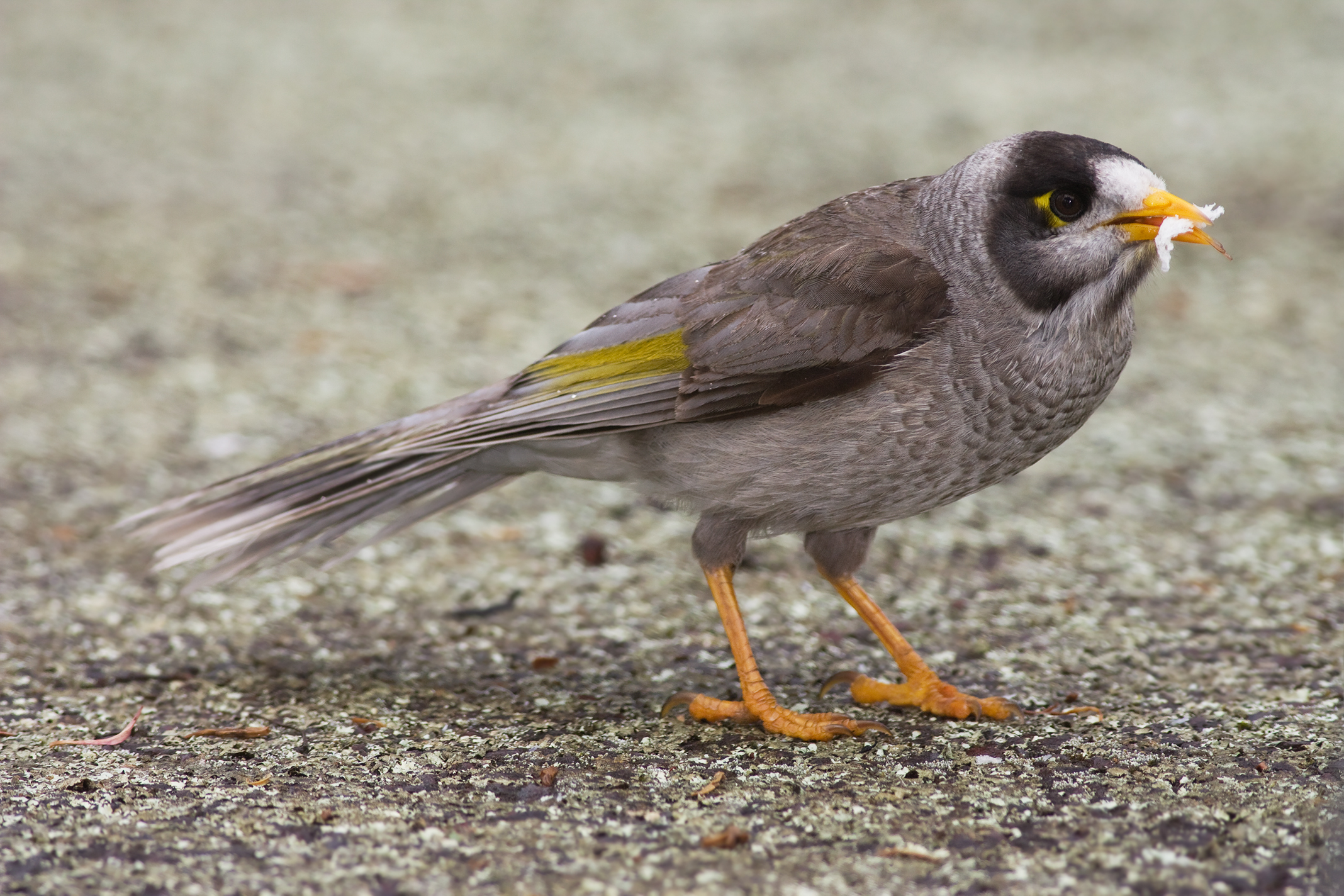
Noisy miner (M. melanocephala)

The genus was first described by French naturalist Louis Pierre Vieillot in volume 19 of his work Nouveau Dictionnaire d'Histoire Naturelle, appliquée aux arts, principalement à l'Agriculture, à l'Écomomie rurale et domestique, à la Médecine, etc. Par une société de naturalistes et d'agriculteurs. Nouvelle Édition in 1818. Later it was misspelt as Manorhina, but is now spelt in its original manner.

Richard Schodde felt the genus was related to the black-headed honeyeaters of the genus Melithreptus and the blue-faced honeyeater (Entomyzon cyanotis) based on their behaviour and appearance. However, DNA sampling in a 2004 study by Amy Driskell and Les Christidis showed that the genus was most closely related to the New Guinea genus Melidectes, and that cooperative breeding evolved independently in more than one lineage of honeyeater. The genus Manorina is divided into two subgenera. The bell miner has a predominantly greenish plumage, different calls and skeletal differences and is possibly an early offshoot. It is classified in the subgenus Manorina while the other three form the subgenus Myzantha. The latter had been previously classified as a separate genus, but reclassified within this one by German ornithologist Hans Friedrich Gadow in 1884.

The name "miner" derives from a mid 19th century re-spelling of the Hindi name "myna", which they resemble, but was not formally adopted until the early 20th century.

=== Subgenera and species ===
Subgenus	Image	Common name	Scientific name	Distribution
Manorina		Bell miner	Manorina melanophrys	southeastern Australia
Myzantha		Yellow-throated miner	Manorina flavigula	Australia west of the Great Dividing Range, except for the Cape York Peninsula, Tasmania and parts of the Northern Territory
Myzantha		Noisy miner	Manorina melanocephala	eastern and south-eastern Australia
Myzantha		Black-eared miner	Manorina melanotis	western Victoria and south-eastern South Australia.
