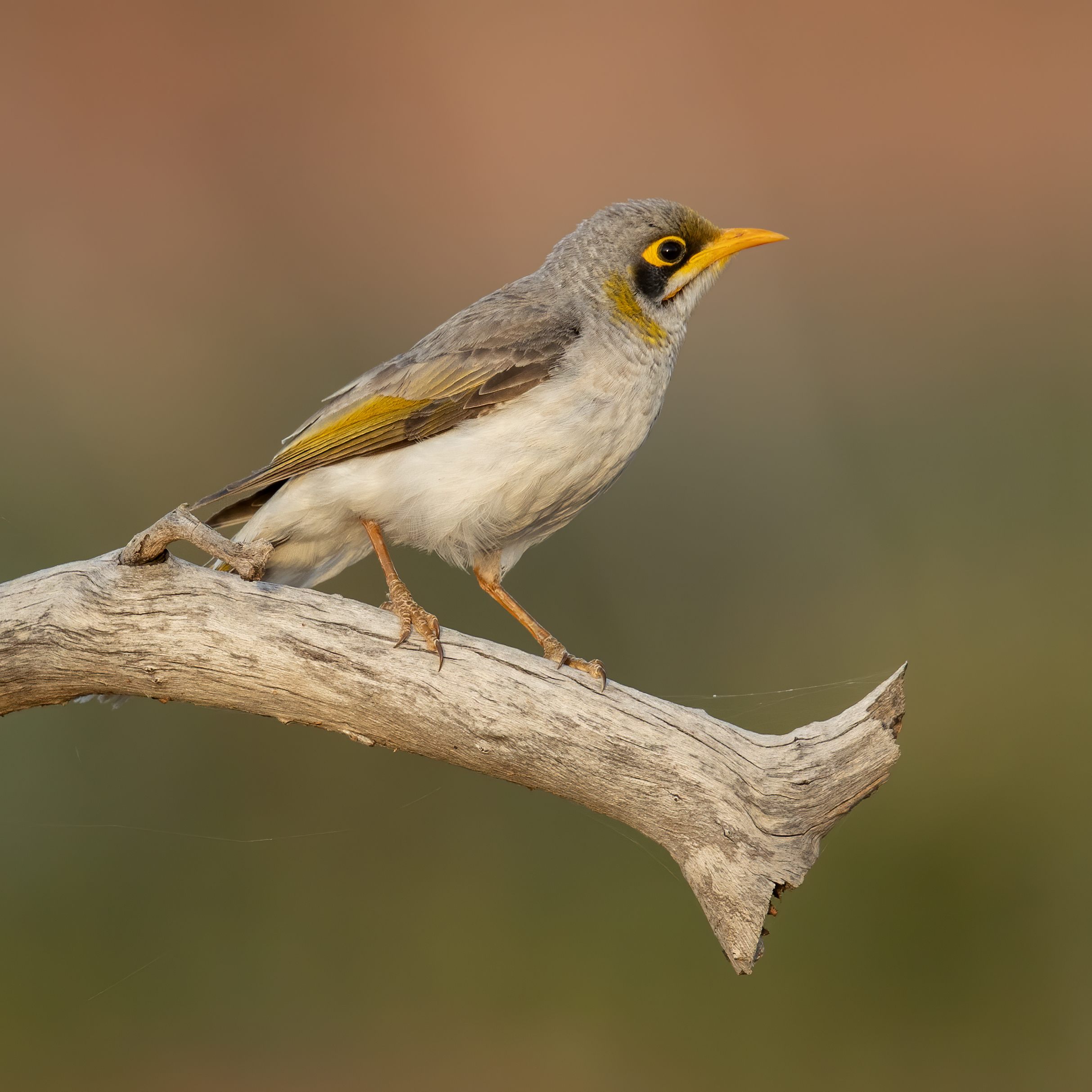

Conservation status
- Least Concern (IUCN 3.1)

Scientific classification
- Kingdom: Animalia
- Phylum: Chordata
- Class: Aves
- Order: Passeriformes
- Family: Meliphagidae
- Genus: Manorina
- Species: M. flavigula

Binomial name
- Manorina flavigula (Gould, 1840)
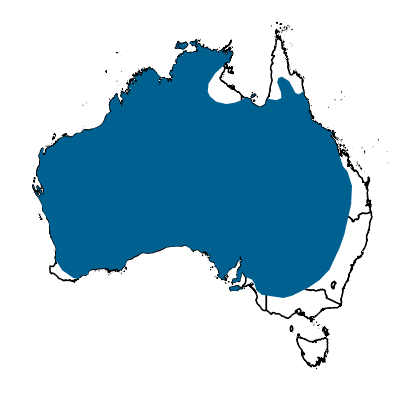
- Yellow-throated miner range

= Yellow-throated miner =

Species of bird

The yellow-throated miner (Manorina flavigula) is a species of colonial honeyeater, endemic to Australia. It is also known as the white-rumped miner. The distinctive white rump is easy to observe in the field and distinguishes it from the other miner species. Yellow-throated miners are medium-sized, grey passerines with yellow throat markings, legs, and bare patches around the eye. The common name 'miner' is an alternative spelling of the word myna, mynah or minah, and is shared with other members of the genus Manorina. Though miners were originally named due to their resemblance to the common myna of South and Southeast Asia that shares similar yellow eye-patch and legs, common mynas are from the starling family and are not closely related to the honeyeater family. Common mynas are an aggressive introduced pest in Australia, which causes some confusion with the native aggressive miners.

Yellow-throated miners feed on invertebrates, nectar, pollen, lerps, and seeds. They are the most widely distributed of the genus Manorina and inhabit open woodlands and scrublands across most of Australia. Yellow-throated miners live in groups, are social, noisy, and defend territory or resources from other avian species. Their behavior is generally compared to their close relative the noisy miner as they share postures, calls and interactions, though yellow-throated miners are not as well studied.

== Taxonomy ==
In 1840, John Gould named the yellow-throated miner Manorina flavigula meaning 'thin-nostrilled, yellow-throated' bird. It belongs to the family of honeyeaters and Australian chats (Meliphagidae), which is part of the superfamily Meliphagoidea. The superfamily also comprises the Australian warblers, scrubwrens, and thornbills (Acanthizidae); bristlebirds (Dasyornithidae); fairy-wrens (Maluridae); and pardalotes (Pardalotidae). Yellow-throated miners share the genus Manorina with three other endemic Australian miners: the bell miner (M. melanophrys), the noisy miner (M. melanocephala), and the endangered black-eared miner (M. melanotis). The yellow-throated miner, black-eared miner, and noisy miner are very similar in appearance and were previously classified in the genus Myzantha, which is still sometimes listed as the subgenus for those species. From genetic analysis, the closest relatives to the genus Manorina are the New Guinea and New Britain Melidectes honeyeaters.

There are five subspecies of the yellow-throated miner: Manorina flavigula melvillenis (Mathews, 1912), Manorina flavigula lutea (Gould, 1840), Manorina flavigula wayensis (Mathews, 1912), Manorina flavigula flavigula (Gould, 1840), and Manorina flavigula obscura (Gould, 1841). M. f. lutea was called the luteous honeyeater, meaning golden or saffron yellow, by Gould, and was recognized as a separate species as recently as 1913. M. f. obscura was previously classified with the black-eared miner as the dusky miner, though the yellow-throated obscura subspecies does not overlap in range with the black-eared miner. One of the principal threats to the endangered black-eared miner is that they readily hybridize with yellow-throated miners where they co-exist, making some suggest that the black-eared miner should be considered a subspecies of the yellow-throated miner. However, further research has demonstrated that before dramatic alteration of the black-eared miner's preferred mallee habitat began around 1950, the two species had separable phenotypic characters, so they should be considered separate species.

== Description ==
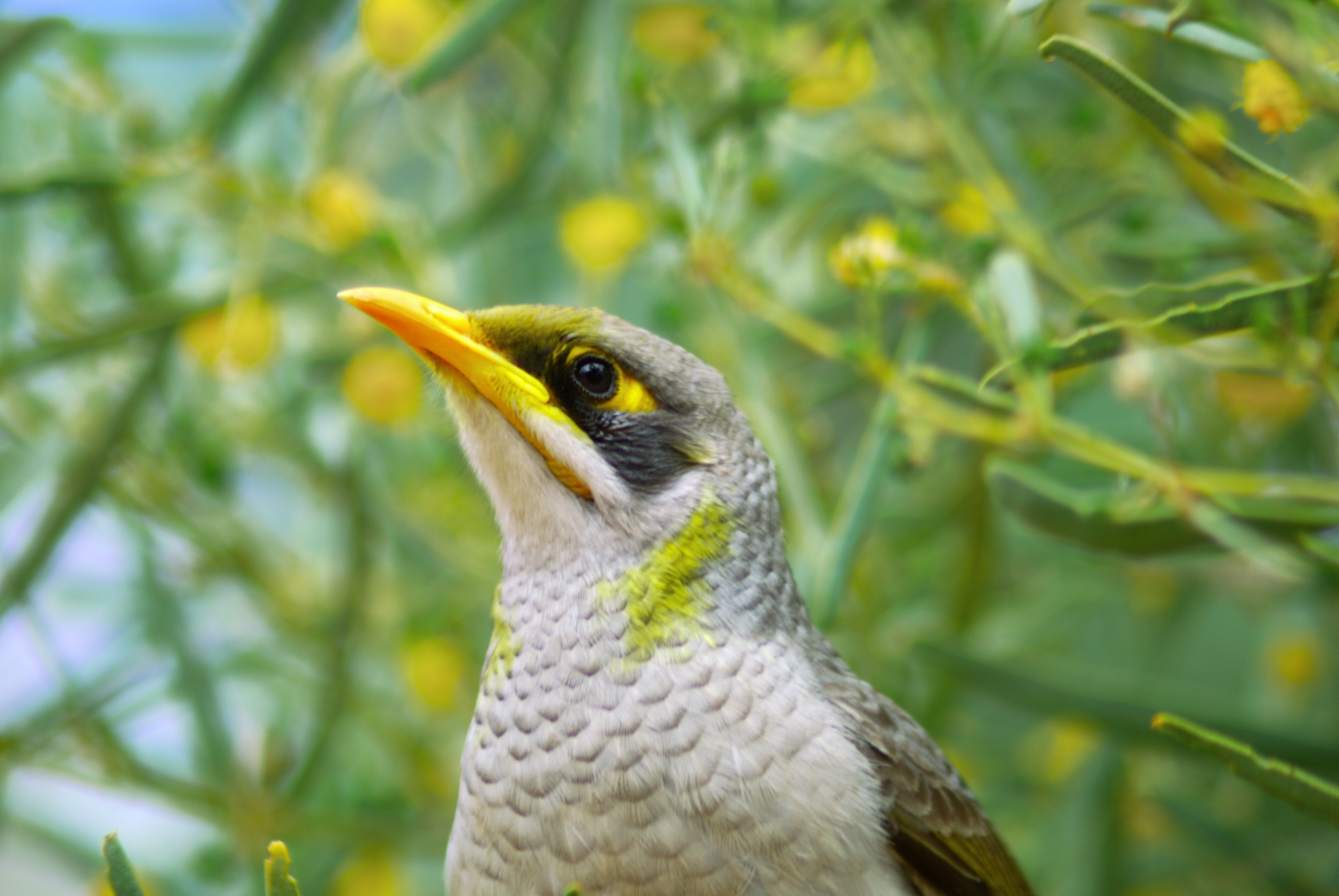
In Yulara, Northern Territory, Australia

The yellow-throated miner's color and shape is very similar to the closely related noisy and black-eared miners. A medium-sized honeyeater, it reaches a total length of 22 to 28 centimetres (8.7–11.0 in), a wing length of 12–13.8 cm (4.7–5.4 in), and a bill length of 25 mm (0.9 in). Adult yellow-throated miners weigh between 50 g (1.8 oz)and 61 g (2.2 oz). Yellow-throated, black-eared and noisy miners share a dark grey dorsal surface with medium grey patterning on the feathers. Wings are dark grey with varying levels of yellow highlighting. The ventral feathering is light grey to white with light grey scalloping on the chest. The feathering surrounding the eye is black. The beak and bare skin-patch around the eyes are bright yellow, and the iris is brown. Legs are also yellow, though shade and brightness varies. Fledgling birds have undefined, fluffy light grey chests without scalloping. Immature birds can be identified in the hand by retained juvenile remiges and rectrices, which are more brownish. Yellow-throated miners are distinctive from the other miners by their clean white rump, instead of the continuous grey from the back that the noisy and black-eared miners have. The white-rump is clearly visible as yellow-throated miners are flying away, so this feature is often used in the field where two miner species overlap. Yellow-throated miners have a varying amount of yellow highlighting above and below the beak, on the forehead and chin, as well as on the sides of the throat. This differs from noisy miners which have white above the beak and no yellow highlighting on the forehead or neck, but can have a small amount of yellow on the chin. Yellow-throated miners have paler feathering on the lower jaw compared to the throat, while pure black-eared miners have darker feathering on the lower jaw compared to that of the throat. Hybrids between the yellow-throated and black-eared miners have a range of rump and lower jaw shades. The different races of yellow-throated miner have small color and size variation. M. f. obscura is known for being darker and M. f. lutea is yellower.

== Distribution and habitat ==
The yellow-throated miner has the widest distribution of the Manorina species, and it is found across most of Australia, except east of the Great Dividing Range, on Cape York Peninsula, the very north-eastern Northern Territory, and small patches of the driest parts in Central Australia. M. f. wayensis has the largest distribution across the middle of Western Australia through to Western Queensland. M. f. flavigula is the easternmost sub-species, and covers most of Queensland except Cape York and the coast from South East Queensland south and extends south through New South Wales and inland Victoria. M. f. lutea extends across the northern parts of Western Australia and the Northern Territory. M. f. obscura occurs in south-western Western Australia . M. f. melvillenis is found in the very northern part of the Northern Territory.

Yellow-throated miners are primarily found in arid and semi-arid regions, but do extend into temperate, subtropical, and tropical areas. They are found in woodlands and scrublands, including acacia, eucalyptus, mallee, and casuarina. Similar to noisy miners they like edges and so adapt well to disturbed habitat, and can be found in regrowth and along roads or next to cleared lands. They like some undergrowth and recolonize restored habitat, but are rarely found in dense growth like mature mallee. Though they prefer some tree cover, yellow-throated miners will venture further into open areas like pastures than noisy miners will.

== Behaviour ==
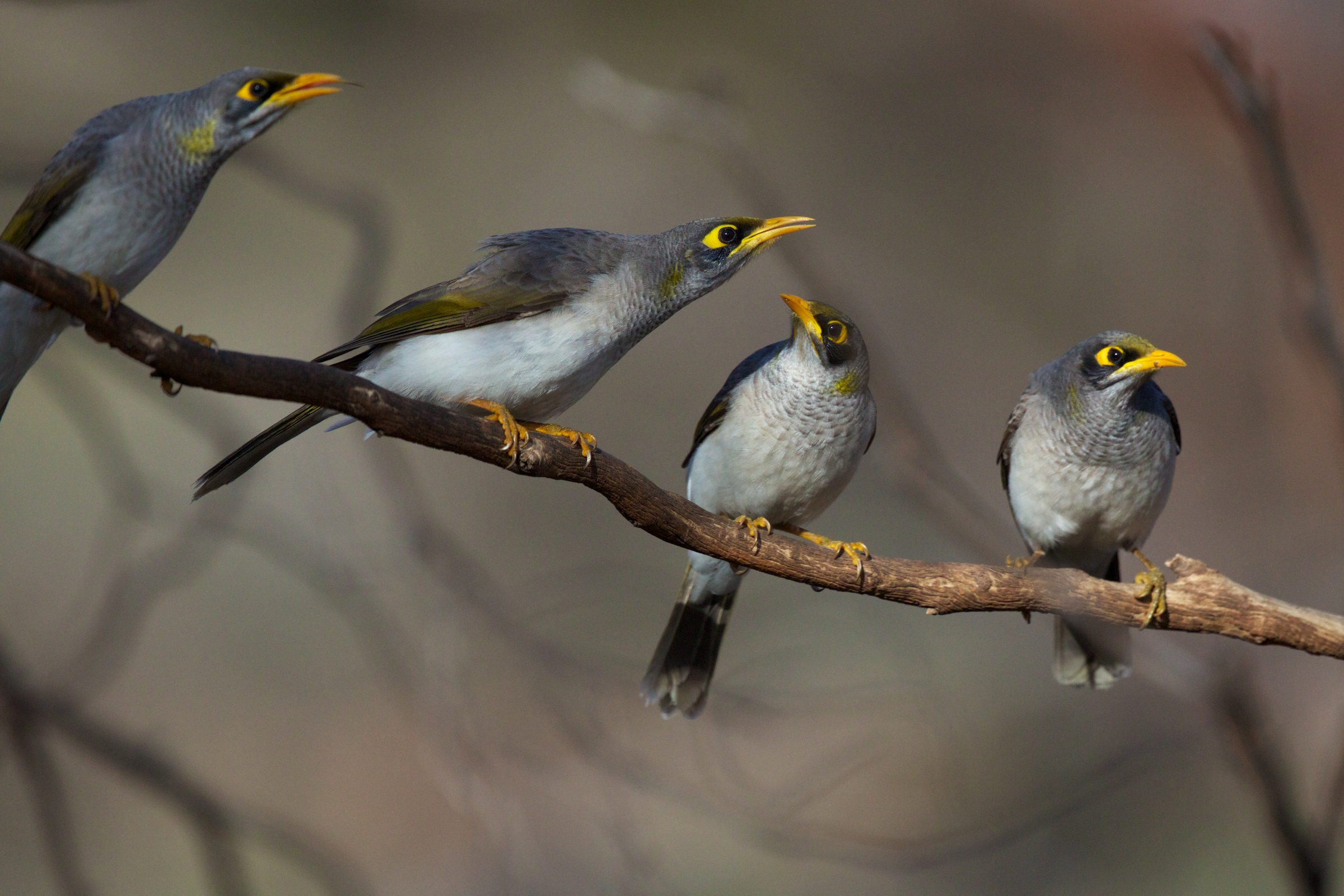
Yellow-throated miners socializing

Behaviour has been observed to be similar to other Manorina species, but the yellow-throated miner is not as well studied as the noisy miner or bell miner. Behaviour comparisons are generally with the noisy miner as they seem to be more similar: both prefer more open forests and adapt well to certain types of disturbed habitats. Yellow-throated miners are possibly less sedentary than the other miner species, though they occur in some locations year around, and there are no known migration patterns for them. They are more often seen in larger groups during the non-breeding season, but these are likely local movements only.

=== Social organization and aggression ===
Yellow-throated miners, like the other Manorina species, have a complex social structure and can live in communal groups of up to 50 birds. They are often found in smaller groups of up to a dozen birds, and sometimes in pairs or solitary. No major behaviour studies have been conducted, but they appear to have a similar social structure to noisy miners as they share many calls, postures, and interactive behaviours. Calls are higher pitched than noisy miner calls, but are readily recognizable as a miner call. They are watchful and are often the first to alarm when a predator appears. As with the other miner species, they are known to be very aggressive to other birds, particularly smaller insectivores and honeyeaters. Yellow-throated miners have been observed monopolizing small patches of remnant vegetation along roadsides and dividing paddocks, which cuts off corridors for smaller birds to move through. Yellow-throated miners, like their relatives the bell miner and noisy miner, have been linked to reduced bird species richness and higher psyllid abundance in disturbed mallee in Victoria. However, a follow-up study found that yellow-throated miner removal did not significantly increase avian richness, as it has done in studies with bell miners and noisy miners. Though yellow-throated miners drive away many species and are not afraid to attack larger birds, they have been found to share territory with grey butcherbirds and pied butcherbirds, and even nest in close proximity to those species. This is surprising as butcherbirds are also aggressive species that predate nests and birds, including larger species than yellow-throated miners, but this association may be to improve the mutual defense of both species, as yellow-throated miners are very watchful and noisy at the approach of a predator. Though they are often aggressive to other species, yellow-throated miners have also been observed feeding with mixed flocks of honeyeaters, including noisy miners, white-plumed honeyeaters, friarbirds, and blue-faced honeyeaters.

=== Feeding ===
Like most honeyeaters, yellow-throated miners have a varied diet, including invertebrates, nectar, and occasionally fruit. Feeding is an active, gregarious, and noisy activity generally carried out in small groups of five to ten, but sometimes in pairs, occasionally large groups, and sometimes with other honeyeater species. Yellow-throated miners forage in the canopy, probing flowers for nectar and gleaning leaves and bark for spiders and insects. However, they do less gleaning than the other miners. Yellow-throated miners will catch insects on the wing, using a sally-stall method around 6% of the time, and they use more wing-powered maneuvers than the other Manorina species. They also forage on the ground, probing around herbs, leaf litter, and stones for invertebrates. Ratio of insects to nectar varies between studies from 65:35 to 70:30. Chicks are fed almost exclusively insects until they fledge and begin exploring flowers for nectar.

=== Breeding ===
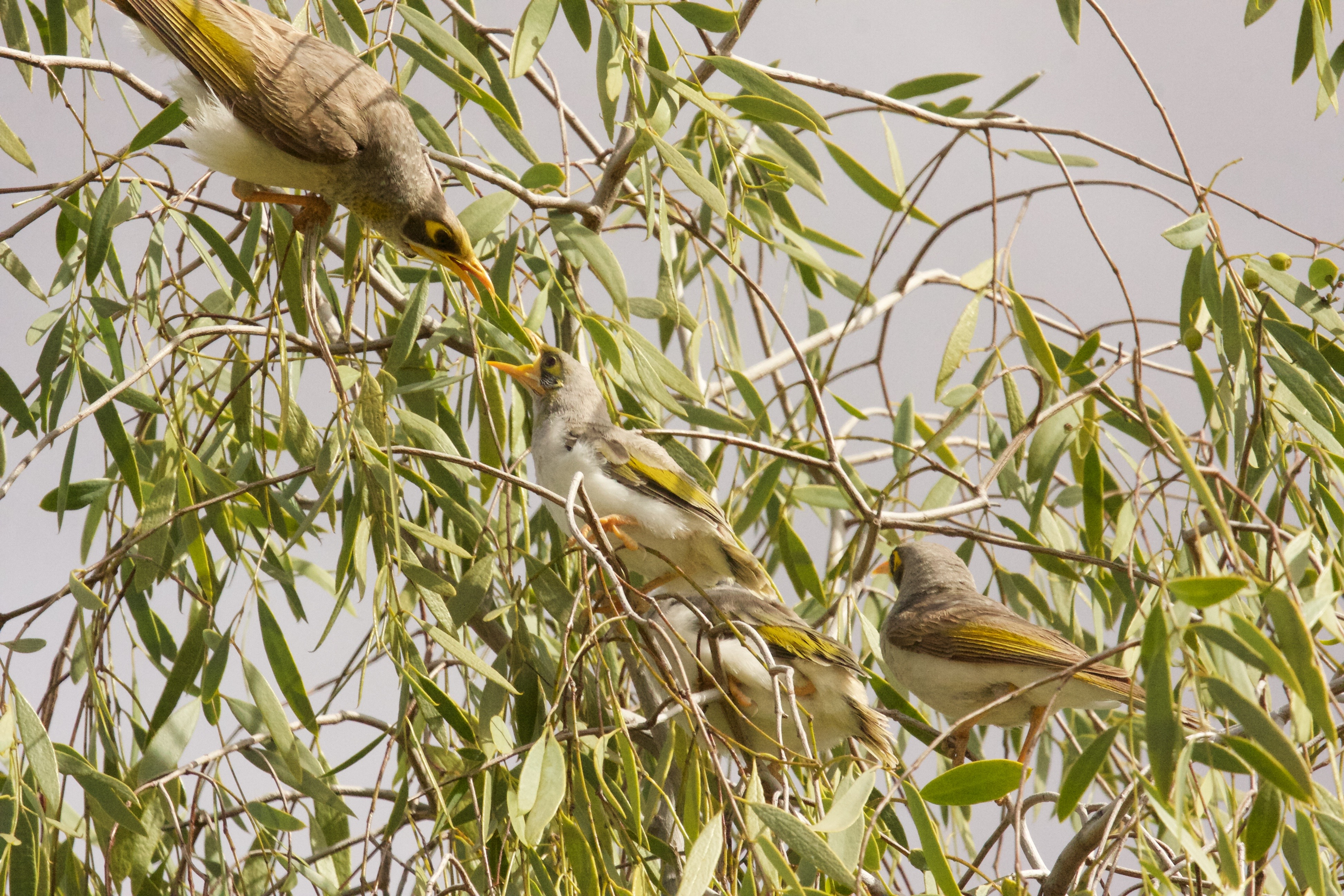
Yellow-throated miner family, Kilcowera Station, QLD

As with the other Manorina species, cooperative and colonial breeding is common, but breeding has also been recorded in isolated pairs. Pair breeding attempts without helpers have a higher failure rate. Breeding has been recorded throughout the year, but is most common from August through October, and multiple clutches are common. The nest is a standard cup or bowl nest built into the fork of a tree with good cover. It is built of woven twigs and grasses and a thick soft interior lining, often of wool. It is similar, but more substantive than the nest of the noisy miner. Clutch size is typically three or four eggs, but there are recordings of both two and five eggs. Eggs are pink-buff eggs with spots concentrated on the larger end. Females typically do all the incubation, but males have been recorded incubating in strong wind. Eggs hatch after an incubation period of 15–16 days. Both parents and any available helpers will feed young in the nest. Up to seven birds have been observed at nests. Helpers are unstudied in yellow-throated miners, but are generally young or unmated males in both bell miners and noisy miners. Nests can be parasitized by either the pallid cuckoo or common koel. Parasitism by pallid cuckoos has been observed to be as high as 12%.

==== Hybridization and the black-eared miner ====
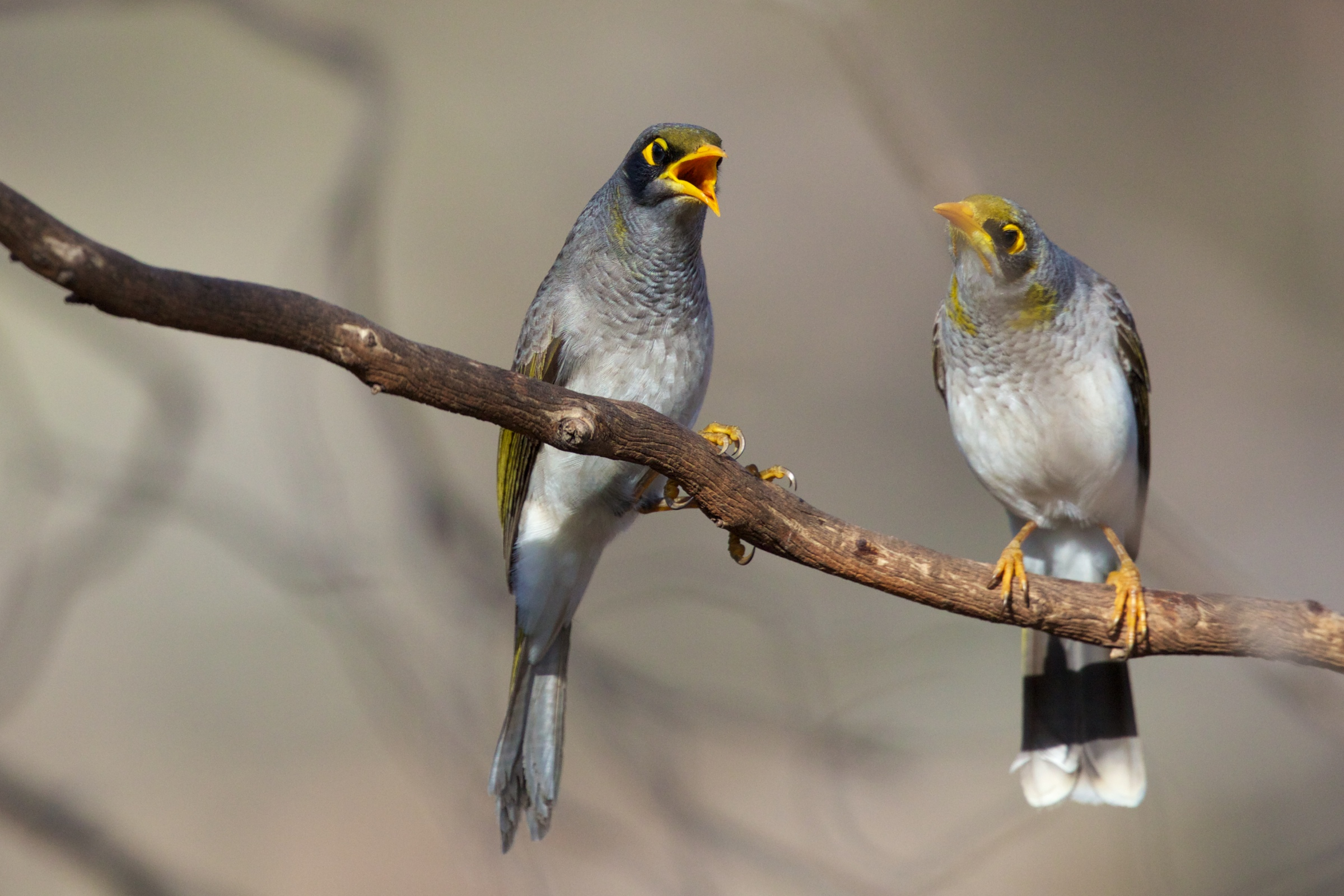
Left is a hybrid yellow-throated × black-eared miner (note dark stripe under lower mandible, less yellow on throat, and darker head) while right is a typical yellow-throated miner, Gluepot Reserve

Yellow-throated miners can hybridize with both noisy miners and endangered black-eared miners, but hybrids with noisy miners seem rare, even though their ranges overlap significantly and they are seen in mixed flocks. However, hybridization with black-eared miners is one of the greatest threats to the black-eared miner's continued existence. Black-eared miners prefer thick, mature mallee habitat, so only infrequently encountered yellow-throated miners until the mature mallee clearing in the mid-twentieth century. Disturbed and partially cleared lands are preferred by the yellow-throated miner, which quickly expanded into the newly opened landscape and began breeding with the black-eared miner. Analysis shows that prior to 1950 the two species had distinct phenotypes, but today there is a continuum due to hybridization. Culls of yellow-throated miners have been done to try to prevent hybridization in reserves that hold the small populations of remaining genetically distinct black-eared miners.
