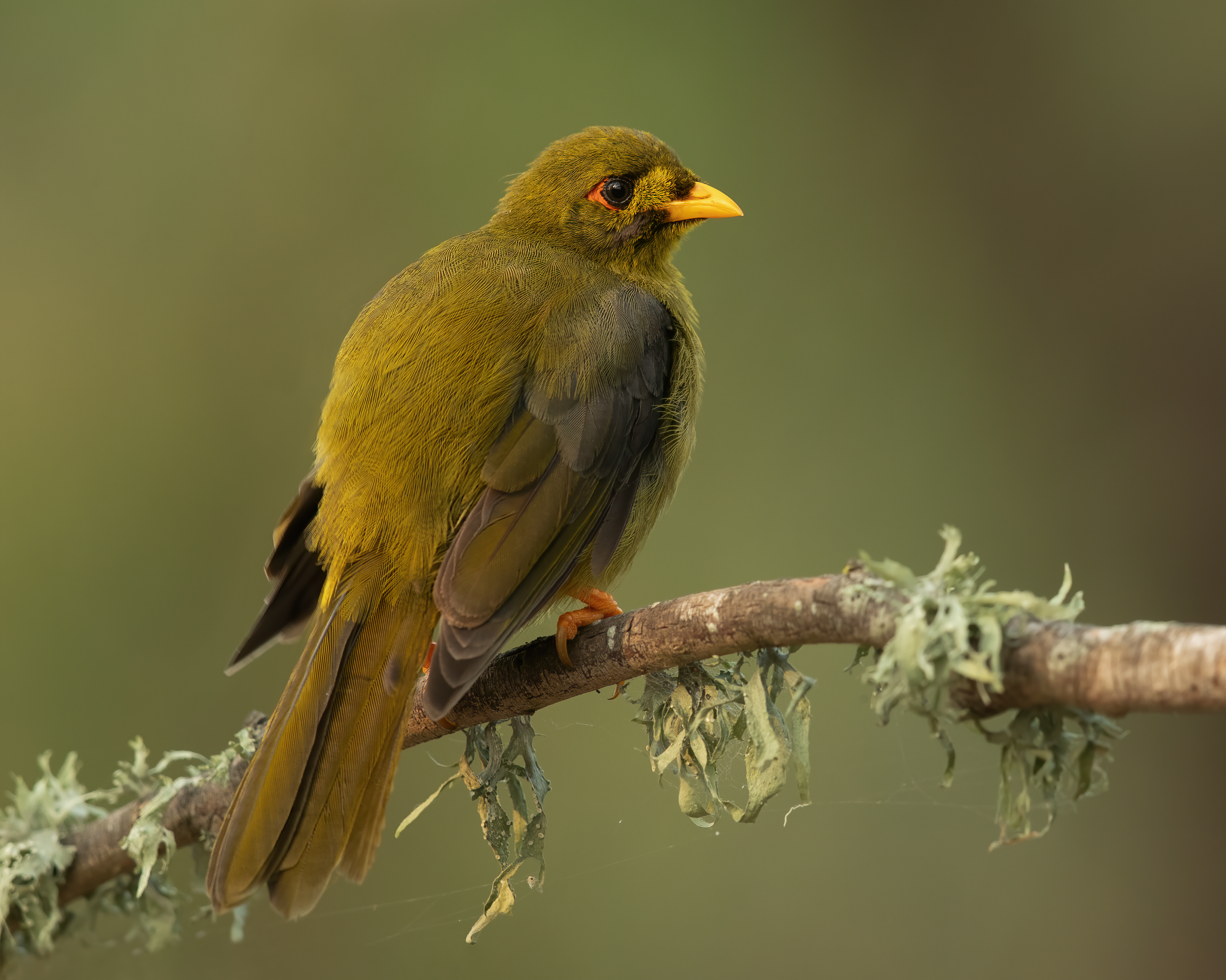

Conservation status
- Least Concern (IUCN 3.1)

Scientific classification
- Kingdom: Animalia
- Phylum: Chordata
- Class: Aves
- Order: Passeriformes
- Family: Meliphagidae
- Genus: Manorina
- Species: M. melanophrys

Binomial name
- Manorina melanophrys (Latham, 1801)
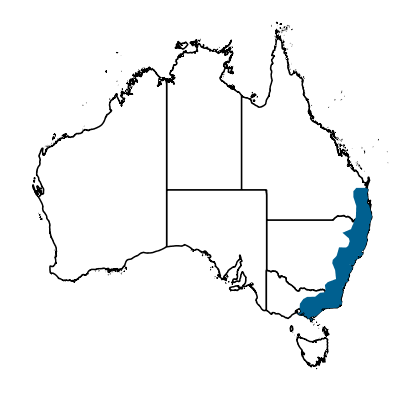
- Bell miner range

= Bell miner =

Species of bird

The bell miner or bellbird (Manorina melanophrys) is a colonial honeyeater, endemic to southeastern Australia. The common name refers to their bell-like call. "Miner" is an old alternative spelling of "myna", and is shared with other members of the genus Manorina. The birds feed almost exclusively on the dome-like coverings, referred to as lerps, of certain psyllid bugs.

Bell miners live in large, complex, social groups. Within each group, there are subgroups consisting of several breeding pairs, but also including a number of birds that are not currently breeding. The nonbreeders help in providing food for the young in all the nests within the subgroup, even though they are not necessarily closely related to them. The birds defend their colony area communally and aggressively, excluding most other passerine species. They do this in order to protect their territory from other insect-eating birds that would eat the bell lerps on which they feed. Whenever the local forests die back, due to increased lerp psyllid infestations, bell miners undergo a population boom.

The heritage listed mountain village of Bellbrook was named after the distinctive sound of local bellbirds in 1882.

== Taxonomy ==
The bell miner (Manorina melanophrys) belongs to the family of honeyeaters and Australian chats (Meliphagidae), which is part of the superfamily Meliphagoidea that also comprises the Australian warblers, scrubwrens, and thornbills (Acanthizidae); bristlebirds (Dasyornithidae); fairy-wrens (Maluridae); and pardalotes (Pardalotidae). Bell miners share the genus Manorina with three other endemic Australian miners: the noisy miner (M. melanocephala), the yellow-throated miner (M. flavigula), and the endangered black-eared miner (M. melanotis). The generic name Manorina is derived from the Ancient Greek manos 'thin' and rhinos 'nostrils'. The three other miners were previously classified in the genus Myzantha, which is still sometimes listed as a subgenus for those species. The closest related genus to Manorina has been genetically found to be the New Guinea and New Britain Melidectes honeyeaters. The bell miner's tinkling bell-like call was noted by early European explorers, and the name bellbird was considered established 30 years later, when David Collins mentioned "the melancholy cry of the bellbird". In 1802, John Latham named the bird Turdus melanophrys meaning 'black-browed thrush'. While Latham's scientific name became accepted, John Gould continued to use Australian bellbird as the name for the species in 1848.

The common name of bellbird may lead to some confusion with the Australian inland endemic crested bellbird, which is a member of the family Oreoicidae. The two species exhibit very different calls, behaviour, and do not overlap in range.

== Description ==
Bouloumba Creek, SE Queensland, Australia

Bell miners are the smallest of their genus, and differ from the other three predominantly grey miner species in having olive-green plumage, darker on the wings and yellower on the belly. They are a medium bodied honeyeater, slightly smaller and stockier than a Lewin's honeyeater (Meliphaga lewinii), weighing between 25 g and 35 g (average 29 g). Bell miners are 17.5–20 cm in length (average 18.5 cm) with a 22–30 cm wingspan (average 26.5 cm). They have the characteristic yellow bill of the miners, which is slightly downturned. The legs are bright orange, and the bare patch behind the eye is red-orange. The crown and lores are black, while the feathers in front of the eye are yellow. A dark streak runs from the corner of the bill downward giving a slight frowning appearance. Eyes are brown and mouth is yellow. Both sexes look alike, though the males tend to be slightly larger. It is possible to determine the sex of the birds by analyzing wing length, tail length, and culmen depth, or by observing calls that are unique to females, but there is no easy way to reliably determine the sex in the field without careful observation of behaviour and calls. Juveniles are more brown-colored than the adults and overall less bright in color. Young birds do not have the bare skin patch behind the eye. The patch initially develops as pale grey, then transforms to pale yellow, and darkens to pale orange before taking on the adult bright red-orange color as the bird matures. Nestlings are born naked and develop light brown down about two days post hatching.

The birds are heard more than they are seen, as bell miners tend to forage high in the canopy, and their olive-green plumage blends into the surrounding leaves. However, they keep up their "ping" contact call as they forage throughout the day. In the Royal Botanic Gardens, Melbourne, bell miners come low enough to be easily seen and photographed.

== Distribution and habitat ==
Bell miners are distributed from around Gympie in Queensland, south along the coastal plain and ranges, to Victoria, around Melbourne. They prefer the margins of wet or dry sclerophyll forest and thick woodlands, often with a stream or other permanent water source nearby. This limits their range to higher rainfall areas near the coast, often bordering, but not inside, rainforest. Compared to the closely related noisy miner, bell miners prefer a denser habitat with a thick understory (<5 m), but a sparse midstory (5–15 m) and canopy (>15m). In an undisturbed setting, bell miners choose habitat with an understory of shrubs, ferns, sedges, and rainforest vines. They have been observed to expand their range in disturbed habitats that have a thick undergrowth of the invasive weed lantana. Bell miner population densities have been measured at 14 to 38 birds per hectare. They are particular about their preferred habitat and reasonably small disturbances to undergrowth, such as fire or lantana removal, can cause a colony to move to a new territory.

== Behaviour ==
=== Social organization ===
The complex social organization of bell miners was observed as early as the 1960s in New South Wales, and has been studied by several research groups in Victoria. Bell miners live in large colonies of 8–200+ birds, which consist of coteries or clans of generally related male birds and their offspring. Each coterie is made up of several monogamous breeding pairs with their nest helpers. As a colony, bell miners are aggressive and set up a permanent territory that they will defend together against all other honeyeaters and any other species, which they perceive are a threat to their preferred food source or themselves. Within the colonial territory, each breeding pair has its own foraging range. Helpers assist multiple breeding pairs, and move between the foraging range of several pairs. Coteries are groups that are interconnected and interact daily within the larger colony, due to a close genetic relationship.

Due to their aggressive nature, bell miners are known for excluding other birds from their territory, and larger avian species, like kookaburras, currawongs, and ravens are mobbed by up to twelve miners from different coteries within the colony. Predators are repeatedly attacked, if they settle in another part of the colony's territory. Small birds that keep to the understory, like fairy-wrens, scrubwrens and blackbirds are often not driven out, but small birds that typically forage in the midstory or canopy or share similar foods, like pardalotes, are not allowed access within the territory. One of the few species that can sometimes displace bell miners is the similarly aggressive noisy miner, but in general noisy miners prefer areas with little understory. Bell miners are able to suppress the numbers of competing species in territory that they hold for years. However, bell miner colonies have clearly defined territorial boundaries, and beyond those boundaries the local bird assemblage resumes its normal diversity.

=== Feeding ===
Bell miners specialize in consuming insects known as psyllids and their associated young nymphs, sweet lerps, and other psyllid secretions. Psyllid products may consist of up to 90% of the bell miner's diet. Bell miners forage primarily among leaves, branches, and loose bark in the canopy, generally at least 8 m in height, but they do descend to the dense understory. There is a theory that bell miners 'farm' psyllids by excluding other psyllid-eating bird species from a large enough territory, that the miners themselves do not require all the psyllids from in order to sustain the colony. One hypothesis under the farming theory is that the bell miners may selectively eat only older nymphs, or may often eat the lerps and leave the nymph unharmed. Evidence for this theory has been mixed. An early study of stomach contents did not find supporting evidence for this theory, as bell miner stomachs did not contain the higher lerp/nymph ratio that would have been expected. However, a later behavioral comparison between bell miners and noisy miners did observe that bell miners carefully used their tongue to remove lerps, which left the nymph intact. In contrast, noisy miners pried the lerp and nymph off with their beak and consumed both. When bell miners are removed, psyllid colonies are generally quickly decimated by the other forest bird species that move into the miners' former territory.

Although psyllids are the primary food source, like most honeyeaters, bell miners have also been recorded drinking nectar from eucalyptus, banksia, and mistletoe flowers, as well as eating various other insects, including spiders, beetles, weevils, moths, and wasps.

==== Bell Miner Associated Dieback ====
Bell miners are so closely associated with eucalyptus dieback that the phenomenon has been named Bell Miner Associated Dieback (BMAD). Concern about BMAD has led to the formation of the BMAD Working Group, the 2004 BMAD Strategy, the 2005 BMAD National Forum, the 2006 BMAD Literature Review, and continues to be an area of active research. Eucalyptus dieback involved complicated ecosystems with numerous variables and occurs in some habitats without the presence of bell miners, but there is a high correlation with bell miner presence and eucalyptus dieback that was noted as early as 1982. One theory is that the monopolising and/or farming of psyllids by bell miners allows psyllid numbers to build up, eventually leading to tree sickness and possibly death. In some cases where bell miners have been removed, the avian diversity has been restored and the psyllid infestation reduced to the point of trees returning to health. However, in other studies, the trees did not recover even after bell miner removal, so more research is needed to better understand the relationship between bell miners and eucalyptus dieback.

=== Breeding ===
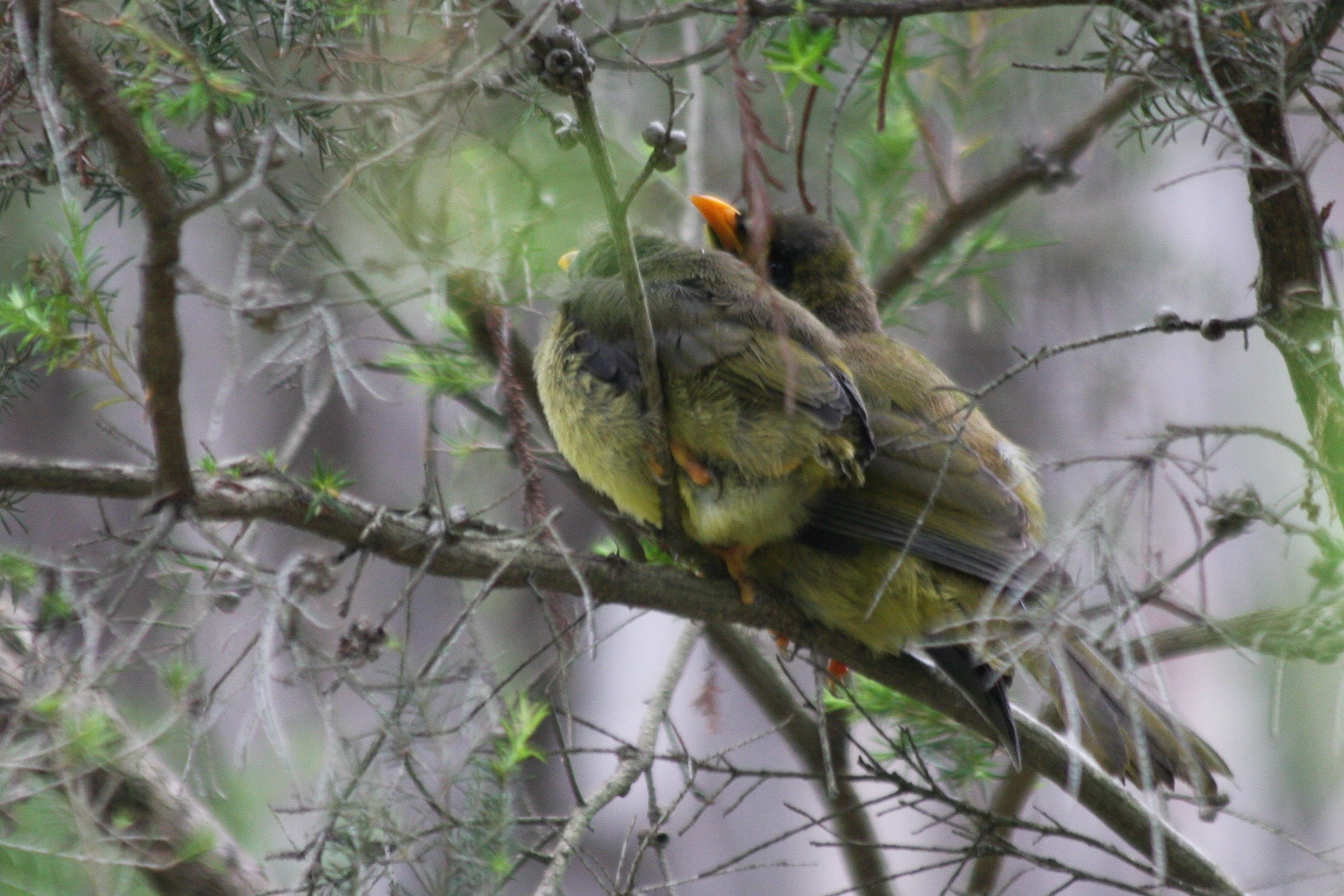
Immature birds

Bell miners are generally sedentary, and thus have a permanent all-purpose territory, which includes breeding. The primary breeding season is April/May to August/September in the northern part of their range and June/July to November/December in the southern range, but breeding has been observed in all months of the year, as females will often nest again after a failed nest or once the young have fledged. One female was recorded nesting five times in one season, though that many nest attempts is unusual. Bell miner pairs are monogamous, but the breeding tasks are divided between the sexes. Female bell miners build the nest over eight days, incubate the one to three (but typically two) eggs for 14.5 days, and brood the young for up to 12 days, depending on the weather. The nests are small, cup-shaped, and built with dry twigs, grasses, and bark woven together with spider web. Nests are generally hidden in the foliage of dense understory plants, 3–5 metres (9.8–16.4 ft) above the ground. The eggs are typically 24 by 16 millimetres (0.94 in × 0.63 in), oval shaped, and pink in color. They have darker reddish-brown spots and blotches, primarily over the larger end. Pallid cuckoos have been recorded as nest parasites for bell miners.

While nests are all within the territory of the colony, they are not tightly packed as traditional colony breeders. Instead, nests are located within the breeding pairs' normal foraging range. They are generally within calling range of neighbour nests, but not too close. Female bell miners move nest locations after a nest failure, and were observed to move nests lower into the thick understory, likely reducing the risk of avian predators. However, they did not move nests far from the original location horizontally, possibly to stay within their home foraging range, and to retain their established set of helpers. Females will also alter brood sex ratios to meet conditions. When a colony is in a new location with an inferior food source, the ratio will be biased towards more females, which will disperse from the colony at sexual maturity. Once the food supply has been increased, the brood sex ratio is shifted towards future helping males.

==== Nest helpers ====
Both parents and helpers provision and care for the nestlings. Nests may be attended by up to 20 helpers, and nest success has been observed to be higher when there are at least 6 additional helpers attending the nest, in addition to the breeding pair. Helpers feed the young, defend the nest against predators, remove droppings, and remove parasites. Nest helpers include both sexes, but are predominately young and breeding age males. Juvenile birds start helping as early as 1.3 months old. Older non-breeding males contribute the most food to nestlings and assist with multiple nests. The amount of help offered by a nest helper is correlated with its genetic relationship with the nestlings it is feeding. Bell miners use a provisioning call when they arrive at the nest to stimulate the young to beg. Provisioning calls are similar among closely related miners, so helpers preferentially help young with fathers that have provisioning calls similar to their own. However, even non-related helpers have been shown to contribute a significant amount to raising young, and no difference was seen in the amount of help offered by helpers, depending on the brood sex, even though male chicks tend to stay with the colony and become helpers, while females disperse. Helpers will delay bringing food to the nestlings when the female is brooding them, but will eventually bring food, even if the female continues to brood. The brooding female is more likely to allow the young to be fed if the attendant is her mate.

==== Fledgling to adulthood ====
Young bell miners leave the nest about 12 days post hatching, but continue to be fed by parents and helpers for a further 10 weeks. Bell miners will start helping at nests when less than 2 months old, but the transition is gradual, such that recently fledged birds will continue to beg from other helpers, and then either consume the offered food or give it to younger birds. Females tend to disperse from the colony at 8 months, and they reach breeding age at 8.3 months. It is likely that the mothers become intolerant of their daughters, as they reach maturity, prompting their dispersal. The mortality of bell miners prior to breeding age is very high at 93%. The greatest risk is soon after young bell miners leave the nest, when many are preyed upon. Known predators include grey currawong, Australian raven, laughing kookaburra, brown goshawk, copperhead snake, and eastern brown snake. By the time they reach breeding age, the sex ratio is skewed with more surviving males, probably due to higher mortality of the dispersing females.
