= Noise (disambiguation) =

Noise is any unwanted sound. More broadly, noise (spectral phenomenon) describes many types of random or unwanted signals, which are listed in that article with related topics.

Noise may also refer to:

== Science and technology ==
- Noise (economic), in a theory of pricing developed by Fischer Black
- Noise (spectral phenomenon), various random or unwanted signals, including acoustic noise
  - Noise, any unwanted sound
  - Noise (electronics), an unwanted disturbance in an electrical signal
  - Noise (signal processing), including in electronics
  - Noise (video), random dot patterns caused by radio interference on analog televisions
- Communication noise, factors that impair human-to-human communication
- Internet background noise, data packets addressed to IP addresses or ports where there is no device to receive them
- Meta noise, irrelevant metadata in computer files
- Noise trader, in financial research, a stock trader that makes random decisions
- Noise Protocol Framework, a framework of handshake patterns for secure data transmission

== Arts and entertainment ==
=== Film and television ===
- Noise (2005 film), a Canadian short film directed by Greg Spottiswood
- Noise (2007 American film), a comedy-drama written and directed by Henry Bean
- Noise (2007 Australian film), a drama written and directed by Matthew Saville
- Noise (2022 film), a Mexican-Argentine drama directed by Natalia Beristain
- Noise (2024 film), a South Korean horror thriller film
- Noise (TV programming block), a Fuji TV late-night anime programming block
- The Noise (British TV series), a 1996 magazine show on ITV
- The Noise (Australian TV series), an Australian music television show
- The Noise (game show), on Universal Kids
- New York Noise, an indie rock music video TV program by NYCTV, 2003–2009

=== Journalism and literature ===
- Noise (short story), 1952 short story by Jack Vance
- Noise: The Political Economy of Music, a 1977 nonfiction book by Jacques Attali
- NOiSE, a 2000 manga series by Tsutomu Nihei
- Noise, a 2006 popular science book by Bart Kosko
- Noise (2017 manga), by Tetsuya Tsutsui
- Noise: A Flaw in Human Judgment, a 2021 nonfiction book by Daniel Kahneman, Olivier Sibony, and Cass Sunstein

=== Music ===
- Noise in music, the occurrence of noise(s) in music, including noise reduction and uses in instrument tone, in composition and in performance
  - String noise, made by guitar players sliding the fingers over the strings

==== Genres ====
- Noise music, a noise-based aesthetic in experimental music and sound art
  - Power noise, a derivative of noise music
- Noise pop, an alternative rock genre developed in the UK in the mid-1980s
- Noise rock, a style of rock music prominent in the 1980s
  - Japanese noise rock

==== Musical artists ====
- The Noise (band), a Puerto Rican musical collective
- The Noise (string quartet), an experimental string quartet from Sydney, Australia
- Noise, an American band including Mika Horiuchi

==== Albums ====
- Noise (Archive album), 2004
- Noise (Boris album), 2014
- NOISE (compilation album), released by Adult Swim, 2016
- Noise, by DecembeRadio, 2005
- The Noise (album), by Peter Hamill, 1993
- Le Noise, by Neil Young, 2010

==== Songs ====
- "Noise" (Kenny Chesney song), 2016
- "Noise" (Nightwish song), 2020
- "Noise", by Silvester Belt, 2017
- "Noise", by Mommy Son, Kim Seung-min, Wonstein, and Zior Park, 2019
- "The Noise" (song), by Le Sserafim and Yoasobi, 2025
- "Noises" (song), by Pale Waves, 2018
- "Noises", by PinkPantheress from Fancy That, 2025

==== Other uses in music ====
- Noise Pop Festival, an indie rock festival started 1993 in San Francisco
- Noise Records, a German record label founded in 1983
- The Noise Company, an American record label

=== Video games ===
- Noise (video game company), a second-party video game developer for Nintendo
- The Noise (Pizza Tower), a character from the 2023 video game

== Sport ==
- Knoxville Noise, a basketball franchise in Knoxville, Tennessee
- Nashville Noise, a basketball franchise in Nashville, Tennessee

== Other uses ==
- Noíse or Naoise, a figure in Irish mythology
- The Noises, an island group in northern New Zealand

== See also ==
- White noise (disambiguation)
- Noize MC (born 1985), Russian rapper
- Noyes
