= Noise (short story) =

1952 science fiction story by Jack Vance

"Noise" is a science fiction story written by Jack Vance in 1952. Also known as "Music of the Spheres", it was first published in the magazine Startling Stories in 1952. It was included in Vance's 1969 collection Eight Fantasms and Magics and was reprinted in the anthologies The Best from Startling Stories, Deep Space, and Strange Glory. It is about a space voyager who is marooned on a beautiful alien planet that seems to have no other inhabitants. Eventually he starts to be aware of mysterious people, towns, and music that exist in a dreamlike parallel dimension.

== Plot ==
A space traveller’s lifeboat spaceship arrives at a strange alien planet. The beautiful world has a strange cycle of days and nights, in which a surreal sequence of multicolored suns seem to move through the sky, changing the color scheme of the planet every day. The orbit of the planet makes the suns appear to move in a zig-zag pattern and change their apparent position in an irregular pattern.

Eventually, the marooned voyager starts to suspect he might not be alone on the planet. He catches brief glimpses of what look like towns or hears a lovely music that does not have a physical source. By focusing on these vague visions, he is able to connect with what seems to be a parallel dimension. He finds that there is a parallel version of himself in the other dimension.

He then meets an attractive woman, and falls in love with her. When a rescue spaceship from Earth arrives to bring him back to Earth, he no longer wants to leave, because he prefers the dreamlike parallel world.
