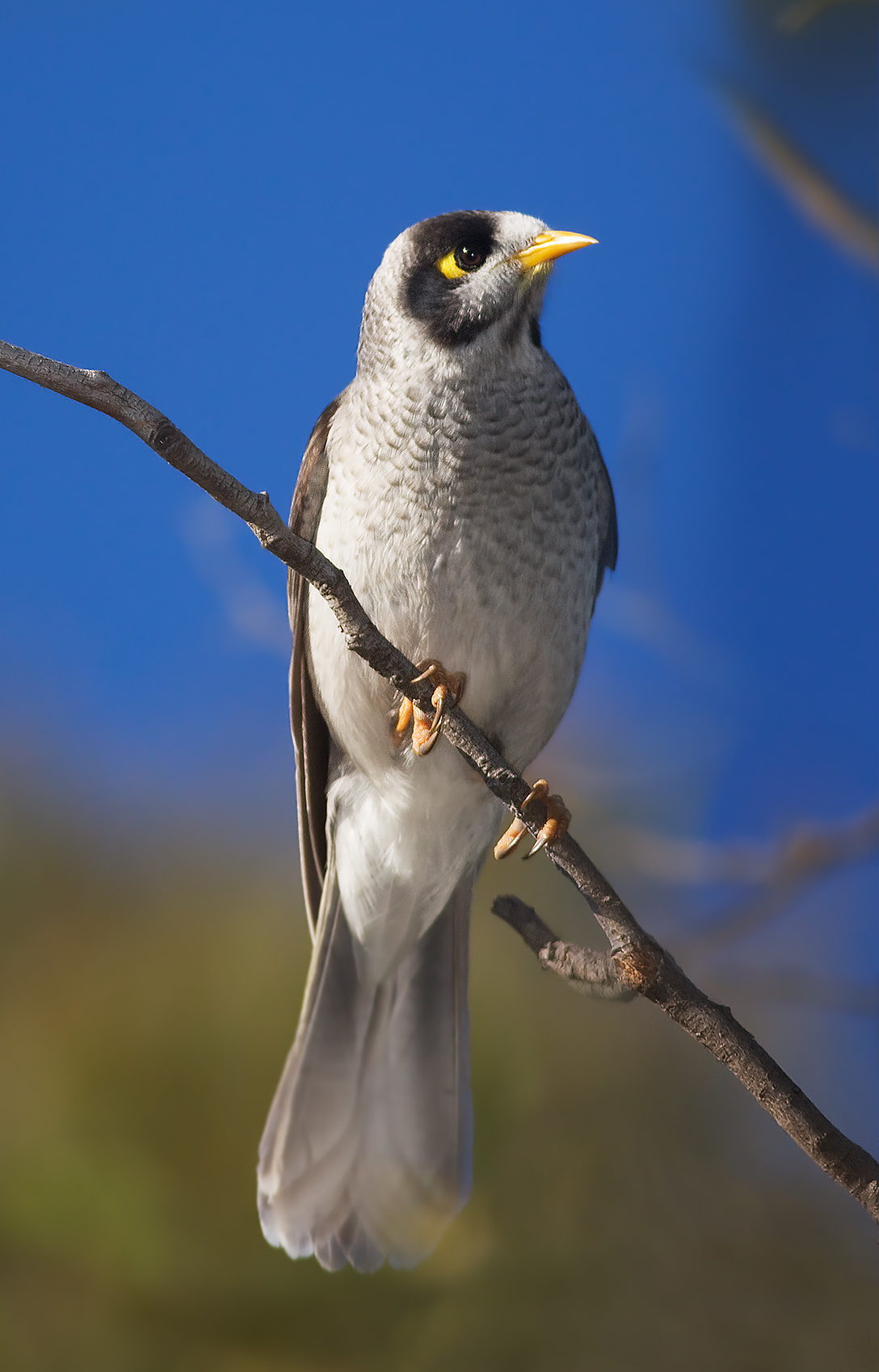
- Subspecies leachi

Conservation status
- Least Concern (IUCN 3.1)

Scientific classification
- Kingdom: Animalia
- Phylum: Chordata
- Class: Aves
- Order: Passeriformes
- Family: Meliphagidae
- Genus: Manorina
- Species: M. melanocephala

Binomial name
- Manorina melanocephala (Latham, 1801)
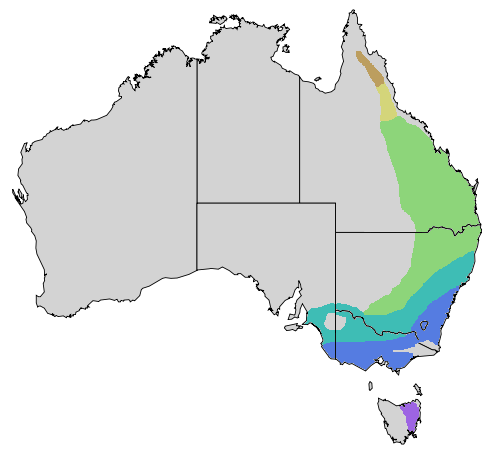
- Noisy miner range ssp. titaniota ssp. lepidota ssp. melanocephala ssp. leachi intermediate zone intermediate zone

Synonyms
- Gracula melanocephala Latham, 1801

= Noisy miner =

Bird in the honeyeater family from eastern Australia

The noisy miner (Manorina melanocephala) is a bird in the honeyeater family, Meliphagidae, and is endemic to eastern and southeastern Australia. This miner is a grey bird, with a black head, orange-yellow beak and feet, a distinctive yellow patch behind the eye, and white tips on the tail feathers. The Tasmanian subspecies has a more intense yellow panel in the wing, and a broader white tip to the tail. Males, females and juveniles are similar in appearance, though young birds are a brownish-grey. As the common name suggests, the noisy miner is a vocal species with a large range of songs, calls, scoldings and alarms, and almost constant vocalisations, particularly from young birds. One of four species in the genus Manorina, the noisy miner itself is divided into four subspecies. The separation of the Tasmanian M. m. leachi is of long standing, and the mainland birds were further split in 1999.

Found in a broad arc from Far North Queensland through New South Wales and Victoria to Tasmania and southeastern South Australia, and out to far north-west Queensland, the noisy miner primarily inhabits dry, open eucalypt forests that lack understory shrubs. These include forests dominated by spotted gum, box and ironbark, as well as in degraded woodland where the understory has been cleared, such as recently burned areas, farming and grazing areas, roadside reserves, and suburban parks and gardens with trees and grass, but without dense shrubbery. The density of noisy miner populations has significantly increased in many locations across its range, particularly in human-dominated habitats. The popularity of nectar-producing garden plants, such as the large-flowered grevilleas, was thought to play a role in its proliferation, but studies now show that the noisy miner has benefited primarily from landscaping practices that create open areas dominated by eucalypts.

Noisy miners are gregarious and territorial; they forage, bathe, roost, breed and defend territory communally, forming colonies that can contain several hundred birds. Each bird has an 'activity space', and birds with overlapping activity spaces form associations called 'coteries', which are the most stable units within the colony. The birds also form temporary flocks called 'coalitions' for specific activities, such as mobbing a predator. Group cohesion is facilitated not only by vocalisations, but also through ritualised displays, which have been categorised as flight displays, postural displays, and facial displays. The noisy miner is a notably aggressive bird, so that chasing, pecking, fighting, scolding, and mobbing occur throughout the day, targeted at both intruders and colony members.

Foraging in the canopy of trees, on trunks and branches, and on the ground, the noisy miner mainly eats nectar, fruit, and insects. Most time is spent gleaning the foliage of eucalypts, and it can meet most of its nutritional needs from manna, honeydew, and lerp gathered from the foliage. The noisy miner does not use a stereotyped courtship display, but copulation is a frenzied communal event. It breeds all year long, building a deep cup-shaped nest and laying two to four eggs. Incubation is by the female only, although up to twenty male helpers take care of the nestlings and fledglings. Noisy miners have a range of strategies to increase their breeding success, including multiple broods and group mobbing of predators. The noisy miner's population increase has been correlated with the reduction of avian diversity in human-affected landscapes. Its territoriality means that translocation is unlikely to be a solution to its overabundance, and culling has been proposed, although the noisy miner is currently a protected species across Australia.

== Taxonomy ==
English ornithologist John Latham described the noisy miner four times in his 1801 work Supplementum Indicis Ornithologici, sive Systematis Ornithologiae, seemingly not knowing it was the same bird in each case: the chattering bee-eater (Merops garrulus), black-headed grackle (Gracula melanocephala), hooded bee-eater (Merops cucullatus), and white-fronted bee-eater (Merops albifrons). Early notes recorded its tendency to scare off prey as hunters were about to shoot. It was as the chattering bee-eater that it was painted between 1792 and 1797 by Thomas Watling, one of a group known collectively as the Port Jackson Painter. John Gould treated the name Merops garrulus as the original description, and renamed it Myzantha garrula in his 1865 work Handbook to the Birds of Australia, giving it the common name of garrulous honeyeater, and noting the alternate name of chattering honeyeater. He noted the colonists of Tasmania called it a miner, and aboriginal people of New South Wales called it cobaygin. Que que gang was a local aboriginal name from the Blue Mountains.

In the early 19th century, Australian ornithologists started using the name Manorina melanocephala instead, because it was listed first by Latham in 1801. This usage did not follow the letter of the International Code of Zoological Nomenclature, and in 2009 the International Commission on Zoological Nomenclature conserved the current name by formally suppressing the name M. garrula. The species name melanocephala is derived from the Ancient Greek words melas 'black', and kephale 'head', referring to its black crown. Other common names include Mickey miner and soldierbird. Four subspecies are recognised, including subspecies leachi found in eastern Tasmania. The mainland population was split into three subspecies in 1999 by Richard Schodde—titaniota from Cape York Peninsula in Queensland as far south as Mareeba, lepidota from central Queensland and inland New South Wales west of Nyngan, and the nominate subspecies melanocephala from southeastern New South Wales, Victoria, and southern South Australia. There are broad zones where birds are intermediate between subspecies. Further study is required to settle the taxonomic status of these populations.

The noisy miner is one of four species in the genus Manorina in the large family of honeyeaters known as Meliphagidae. The other three species of the genus Manorina are the black-eared miner (M. melanotis), the yellow-throated miner (M. flavigula), and the bell miner (M. melanophrys). One of the most obvious characteristics of the genus is a patch of bare yellow skin behind the eyes, which gives them an odd 'cross-eyed' look. Within the genus, the noisy, black-eared and yellow-throated miners form the subgenus Myzantha. The noisy miner occasionally hybridises with the yellow-throated miner. Molecular analysis has shown honeyeaters to be related to the Pardalotidae (pardalotes), Acanthizidae (Australian warblers, scrubwrens, thornbills, etc.), and the Maluridae (Australian fairy-wrens) in the large superfamily Meliphagoidea.

== Description ==
=== Appearance ===
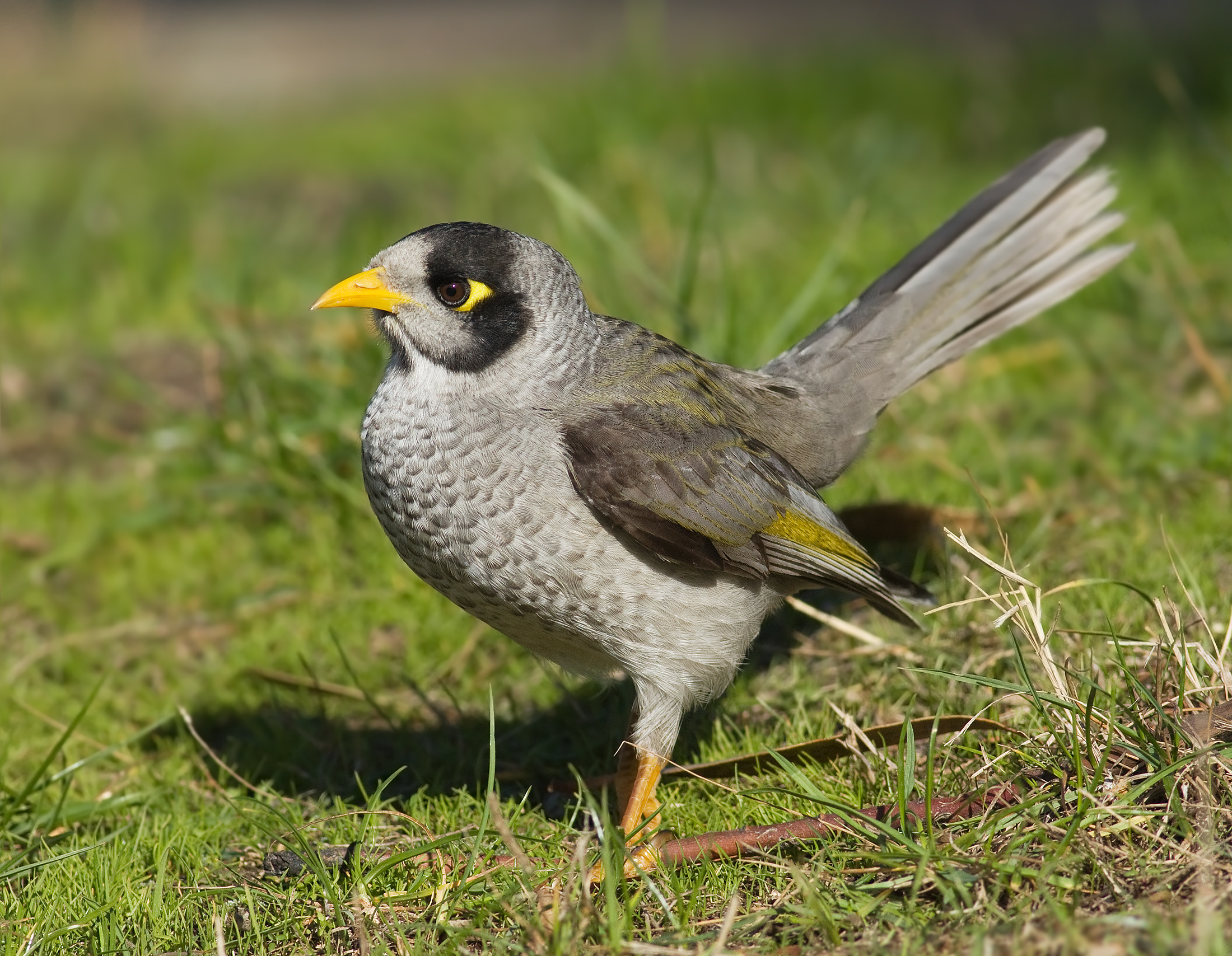
A grey bird with a distinctive yellow patch behind the eye, yellow-orange bill and feet and a yellow-olive patch on the wing

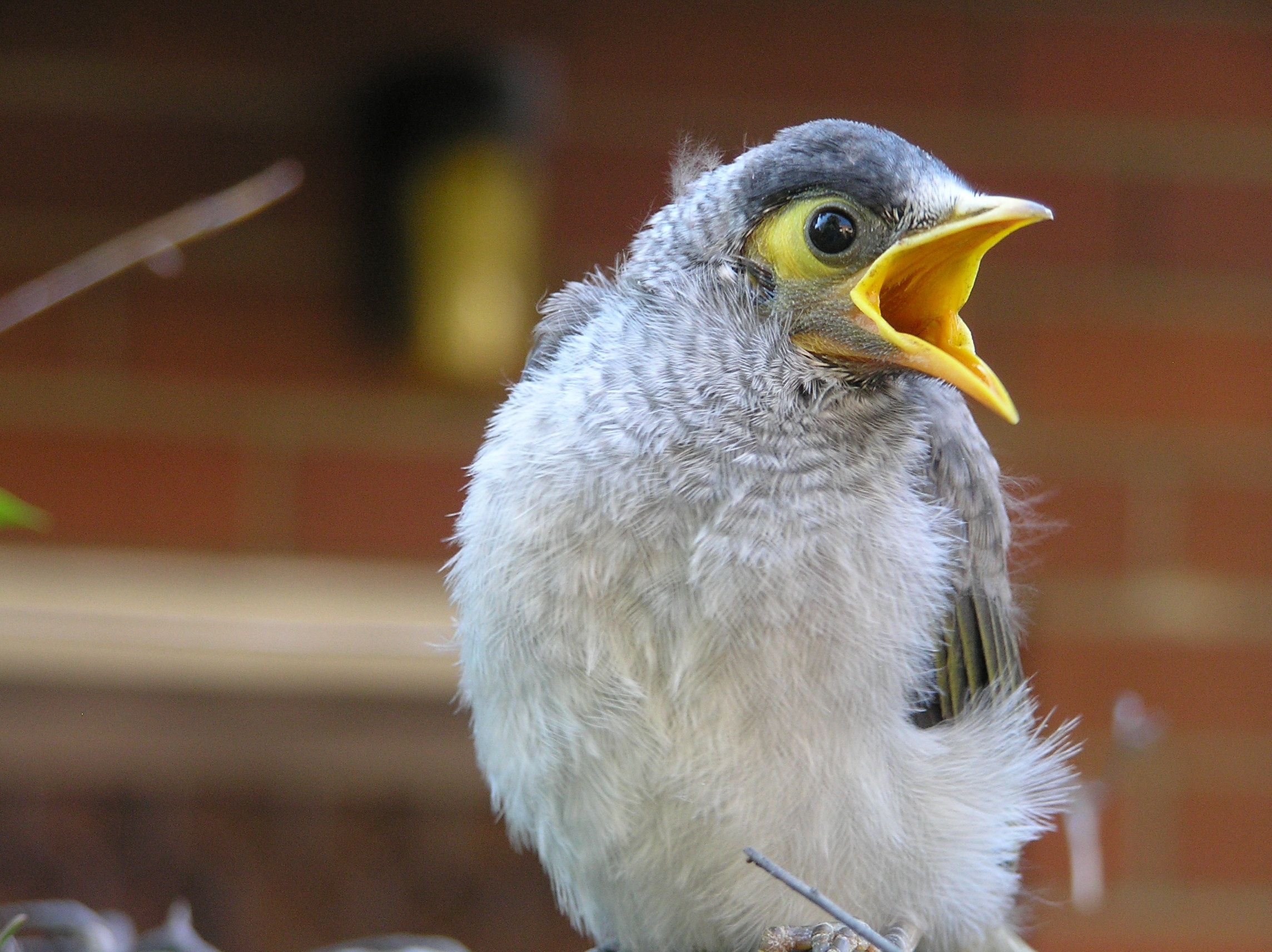
Fledglings utter 85 to 100 'chip' calls in a minute.

The noisy miner is a large honeyeater, 24–28 centimetres (9.4–11.0 in) in length, with a wingspan of 36–45 centimetres (14–18 in), and weighing 70–80 grams (2.5–2.8 oz). Male, female and juvenile birds all have similar plumage: grey on the back, tail and breast, and otherwise white underneath, with white scalloping on the nape and hind-neck, and on the breast; off-white forehead and lores; a black band over the crown, bright orange-yellow bill, and a distinctive patch of yellow skin behind the eye; a prominent white tip to the tail; a narrow olive-yellow panel in the folded wing; and orange-yellow legs and feet. A juvenile can be distinguished by softer plumage, a brownish tinge to the black on its head and the grey on its back, and a duller, greyish-yellow skin-patch behind the eye.

The noisy miner is similar in appearance to the yellow-throated miner and the black-eared miner; it has a dull white forehead and a black crown, while the others have grey heads.

==== Geographical variations ====
Size variation in the noisy miner over its range follows Bergmann's rule; namely, birds tend to be larger where the climate is colder. Adults from central-eastern and northern Queensland tend to have little or no olive-yellow edging to the feathers of the back and wings, and have a wider white fringe on the feathers of the hind-neck and back, giving birds from Queensland the appearance of having more distinctive scalloping than other populations. Wing length generally increases with latitude, yet M. m. leachi has measurably shorter wings than the nominate race, although no significant difference in wing length was found in a study comparing populations north of 30° S and south of the Murray River. The subspecies leachi also has finer scalloping on the hind-neck than the nominate race, a more intense yellow tinge to the wing panels, and a slightly broader off-white tip to the tail.

The far north Queensland subspecies titaniota has a shorter tail, paler crown, larger yellow skin-patch, and paler upper parts without the yellow-olive of the nominate race; and lepidota, found in western New South Wales, is smaller than the nominate race with a black crown, and darker, more mottled upperparts.

=== Vocalisations ===
As the common name suggests, the noisy miner is an unusually vocal species. Previously known as the garrulous honeyeater, it has a large and varied repertoire of songs, calls, scoldings, and alarms. Most are loud and penetrating, and consist of harsh single notes. It has two broad-frequency alarm calls that are used when mobbing intruders into their territory, or when predators (including humans) are sighted; and a narrow-frequency alarm call that is primarily used when airborne predators are seen, such as the brown falcon (Falco berigora), or other large flying birds, including the Australian magpie (Gymnorhina tibicen) and the pied currawong (Strepera graculina). The aerial predator alarm call is a series of high-pitched, slurred whistling notes. The broad-frequency alarm calls are a series of 'churr' notes, low-pitched and harsh, occurring at low and high levels of intensity. The narrow-band call is used in situations where the bird signals the presence of a predator and restricts information about its own location, while the broad-band alarm is used to attract attention, and can initiate mobbing behaviour. These churring calls vary between individuals, and laboratory tests show that noisy miners can distinguish calls by different birds. Hence, this may be integral to the complex social structure of the species.

Noisy miner bird call
Bird call of the noisy miner

Contact or social facilitation calls are low-pitched sounds that carry long distances. 'Chip' calls are given by individual birds when foraging, and a similar call is given by nestlings that call at an increased rate as the mother approaches the nest. Where there is a high level of social activity, such as during territorial disputes with conspecifics, calls are a series of quick, regular, single notes. The noisy miner has a mating display flight song: a soft warble of low-frequency notes given during short, undulating flights by the male, and responded to by the female with a low-frequency whistle. The noisy miner is found in open woodland habitats, where it is an advantage to call from the air, so as to overcome sound attenuation. Another display call, described as 'yammer', is a rapid rhythmical series of notes that is uttered during open-bill, wing-waving displays. The noisy miner has a song described as the 'dawn song'—a communal song of clear, whistled notes emitted in chorus in the early hours of the morning from May through January. The dawn song, which is also sung at dusk, is audible over long distances and features duets that often involve antiphony.

Juvenile noisy miner
Juvenile begging for food. Two Adults sound an alarm call at the end of the recording.

A nestling begins to give the 'chip' call soon after it emerges from the egg, and it calls frequently for the first two-thirds of the nestling period and constantly for the last third. The call does not vary in the presence of an adult at the nest, so it seems likely that the call is not directed at the adult bird. The nestling becomes silent when an adult gives an alarm call, and makes a squealing sound when the adult delivers food. The begging call of a fledgling is similar to the call of the nestling, but significantly louder and covering a greater frequency range (which may make it more directional). The rate of calling, on average, is 85 to 100 calls in a minute, and in open scrub, the call can be heard up to a kilometre away. Subsong, a juvenile vocalisation comprising elements of various calls, begins to be uttered when the fledgling is around thirty days old.

The noisy miner also produces non-vocal sounds by clicking or snapping its bill, usually during antagonistic encounters with other bird species, or when mobbing a predator.

== Distribution and habitat ==
The noisy miner is endemic to eastern and southeastern Australia, occupying a broad arc from Far North Queensland where there are scattered populations, to New South Wales where it is widespread and common from the coast to a line from Angledool to Balranald, through Victoria into southeastern South Australia, and eastern Tasmania. Its range in South Australia has been steadily expanding since it was first recorded near Adelaide in the early 1890s. It is sedentary over its entire range. The noisy miner is territorial, and the territory of a colony is aggressively defended—which has led to a significant reduction in avian diversity in areas occupied by the noisy miner, with smaller species excluded.

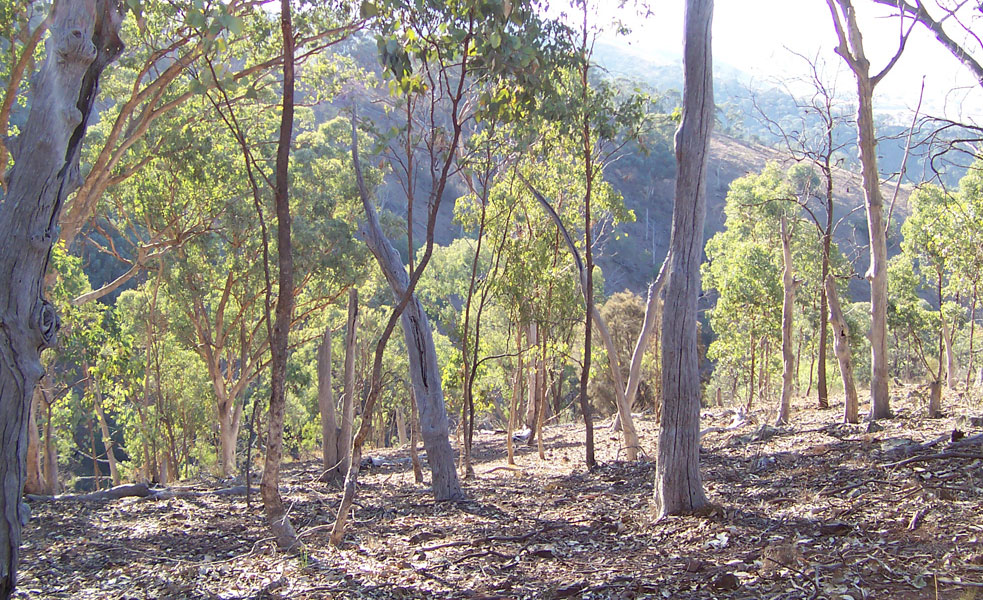
Open eucalypt forests without understory shrubs suit the noisy miner.

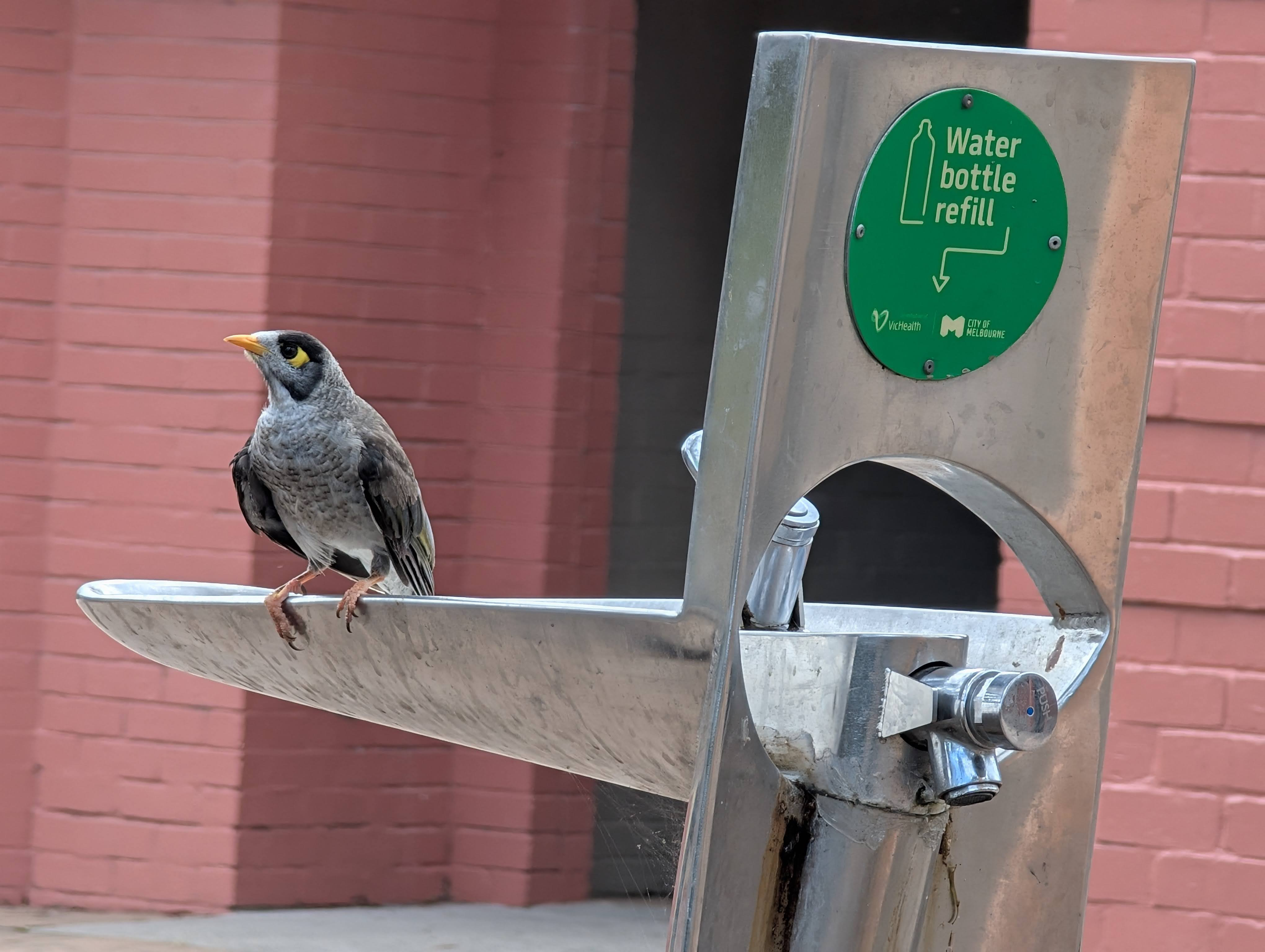
Noisy miner (Manorina melanocephala), Melbourne, Australia

The noisy miner primarily inhabits dry, open eucalypt forest without understory shrubs. It is commonly found in open sclerophyll forests, including those on coastal dunes or granite outcrops; forests dominated by spotted gum on mountain ridges and exposed slopes; box and ironbark forests on the foothills of the Great Dividing Range; mixed forests of eucalypts and cypress (Callitris); forests dominated by yapunya, mulga, gidgee, brigalow or emu bush; in stands of belah and scattered clumps of boree; on the edges of woodlands of river red gum, including swamp woodlands bordering floodplains, and areas dominated by exotic species, such as European ash and willow. It regularly inhabits degraded patches of forest where the understory has been cleared, including recently burned areas, and modified habitats, such as lightly-timbered farming and grazing areas, roadside reserves, bushland remnants in towns and cities, and suburban parks and gardens with trees and grass, but without dense shrubbery.

The noisy miner has benefited from the thinning of woodland on rural properties, heavy grazing that removes the understory, fragmentation of woodland that increases the percentage of edge habitat, and urban landscaping practices that increase open eucalypt environments. It has been described as a 'reverse keystone' species, as it is colonising an ever-increasing range of human-dominated habitats, and aggressively excluding smaller bird species from urban environments. This phenomenon has been also observed in rural areas. A field study across the South West Slopes of New South Wales showed that the noisy miner's presence corresponded with reduced numbers of insectivorous birds, such as fantails, whistlers, the restless flycatcher (Myiagra inquieta), and other honeyeater species, and that this decrease was most marked in sites with better access to water and nutrients. While it has been hypothesised that the proliferation of large-flowering grevillea cultivars has contributed to the abundance of noisy miners, recent research has identified the proliferation of lightly treed, open areas, and the presence of eucalypt species as the most significant factors in the population increase. Large-flowered grevillea hybrids, such as Grevillea 'Robyn Gordon', can benefit the noisy miner, in that an abundance of resources is usually dominated by larger, aggressive honeyeaters, and a continuous nectar source could provide an advantage for the non-migratory species. A field study in box-ironbark country in central Victoria found that noisy miner numbers were correlated with the occurrence of yellow gum (Eucalyptus leucoxylon), which reliably produces flowers (and nectar) each year. The abundance of the noisy miner is primarily determined by habitat structure.

While the range of the noisy miner has not significantly expanded, the density of the population within that range has substantially increased. High densities of noisy miners are regularly recorded in forests with thick understory in southern Queensland, 20 kilometres (12 mi) or more from the forest/agricultural land edge. Many of these sites have extensive road networks used for forest management, and picnic areas and walking tracks for recreational use, and it has been found that these cleared spaces play a role in the abundance of noisy miners in the forest. There is evidence to suggest that higher road densities correspond with higher noisy miner population levels. Field work in Victoria showed that noisy miners infiltrated anywhere from 150 to 300 m (490 to 980 ft) into remnant woodland from the edges, with greater penetration occurring in less densely forested areas. This has implications for the size of woodland habitat needed to contain miner-free areas—around 36 hectares (89 acres). Revegetation projects restoring buloke woodland, a species of she-oak integral to the survival of the red-tailed black cockatoo (Calyptorynchus banksii), have been interplanted with a nurse species, usually fast-growing eucalypts. Noisy miner populations were more likely in those buloke woodlands where eucalypts had been planted at densities of up to 16 per hectare (6.4 per acre). The presence of noisy miners was accompanied by a substantial difference in number and types of other birds found in the woodland.

== Behaviour ==
=== Social organisation ===
The noisy miner is a gregarious species, and the birds are rarely seen singly or in twos; they forage, move and roost in colonies that can consist of several dozens to several hundred birds.

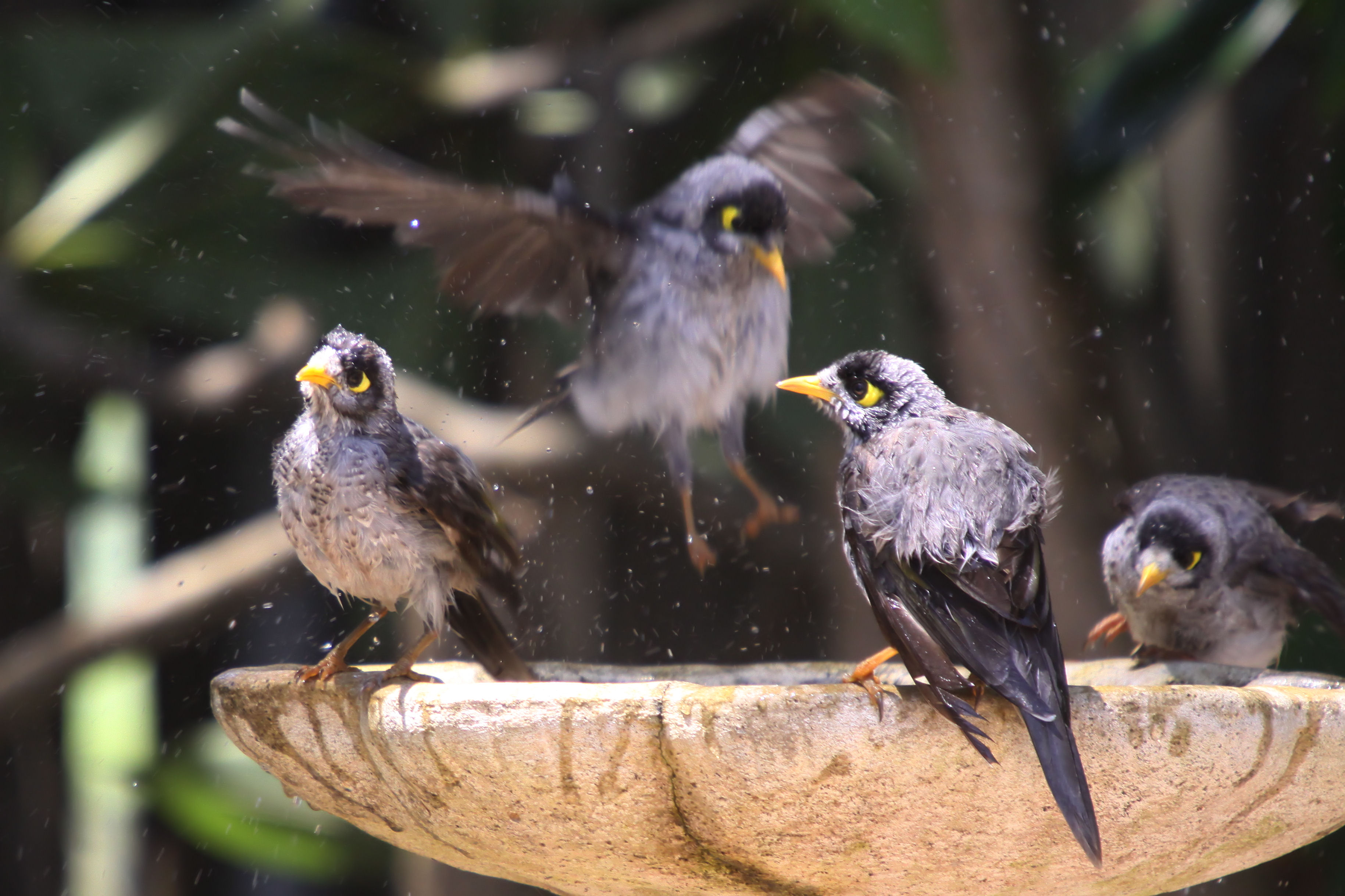
A gregarious species, the noisy miner engages in most activities communally.

Within a colony, a male bird will occupy an 'activity space', which will overlap with the activity spaces of other males. Males with overlapping activity spaces form associations called 'coteries', usually consisting of 10 to 25 birds. Coteries are the most stable unit within the colony. The birds also form temporary flocks when engaged in the same activity. These flocks, called 'coalitions', usually comprise five to eight birds, although coalitions of up to 40 birds can occur when mobbing a potential predator. Membership of the coalition changes frequently as individuals leave the group as it passes beyond the boundary of their activity space, or the activity ends or changes, as when the breeding season begins. Females use activity spaces that overlap with those of male birds, but not other females, so that females will join coalitions with males in their area, but only rarely will there be more than one female in the coalition. The exclusivity of female activity spaces leads to young females being driven out of the colony in which they were born, and also makes it difficult for them to gain a place in a new colony. A study of banded nestlings that survived in one colony until the next breeding season, found that they were all male birds, suggesting that all female nestlings had died or left the colony. Emigration of males does not seem to occur until the population density of the colony reaches a critical level.

Looking after the young is communal, with males of the coterie bringing food to the nestlings and removing faecal sacs. Communal feeding increases after fledging, when males from nearby coteries may even bring food to the young birds, if not driven off. Roosting is usually communal, with two to six adults and juveniles roosting in contact with each other, usually near the end of a hanging branch up to 20 metres (66 ft) above ground, within their activity space. They select a new site each evening, often selecting and rejecting several sites, and engaging in aggressive calling and chasing as other birds attempt to join the group. They are often the last birds to roost at night, but appear to sleep soundly, undisturbed by torchlight. Noisy miners drink together at the edge of lakes and dams, and from cattle troughs, often perching on a submerged branch. They bathe by diving head first into water and, when almost totally submerged, flapping their wings vigorously and ducking their heads under the water. They shake excess water off and then fly to a nearby branch to preen. They have been observed using rain- or dew-soaked foliage to bathe, and in dry weather will dust-bathe in dry soil or fine litter, such as grass clippings. Bathing is communal, with birds stimulated to participate by observing others. They are occasionally observed anting.

==== Flock behaviour ====
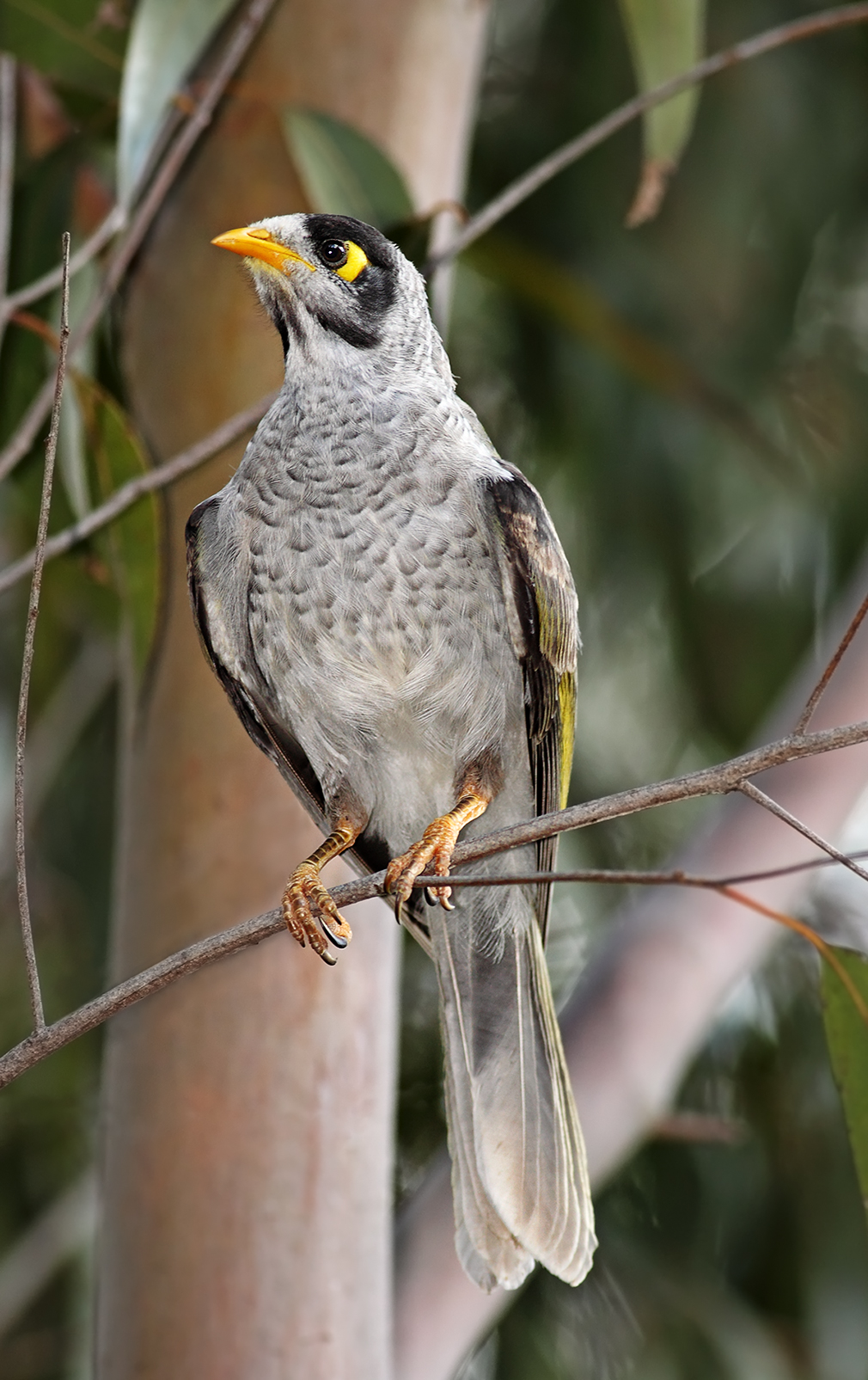
The tall posture is a mild threat signal.

The noisy miner engages in most activities in a group. Roosting, foraging, preening, bathing and dust-bathing or anting are communal activities. Dawn song is a communal chorus, particularly during the breeding season. The communal interaction is facilitated by ritualised displays that have been categorised as flight displays, postural displays, and facial displays. In 'long flight' displays, initiated by either male or female birds, groups of up to twenty birds from more than one coterie fly about 40 metres (130 ft) above the canopy for distances of up to 1.5 kilometres (0.93 mi) from the colony, constantly calling and not returning to the colony for about twenty minutes. As they return, the remaining birds show signs of agitation, and sometimes fly up to join them. The 'short flight' display is performed by the male, and may be analogous to the territorial advertising displays of other birds. In a ritualised movement, the noisy miner flies out from a perch across an open area, in a rhythmic undulating pattern, usually calling in flight. At the end of the clearing it turns on an upward swoop and flies silently back to a perch near the starting point. The 'head-up flight' is performed by the female during the nesting period, and may function to attract male helpers. In its most intense form the body and tail are held almost vertically, with legs dangling, and the head held up and back. It is performed by the female when she is selecting the nest site, and when carrying nest-building material, and probably has the function of indicating the location of the nest to other group members.

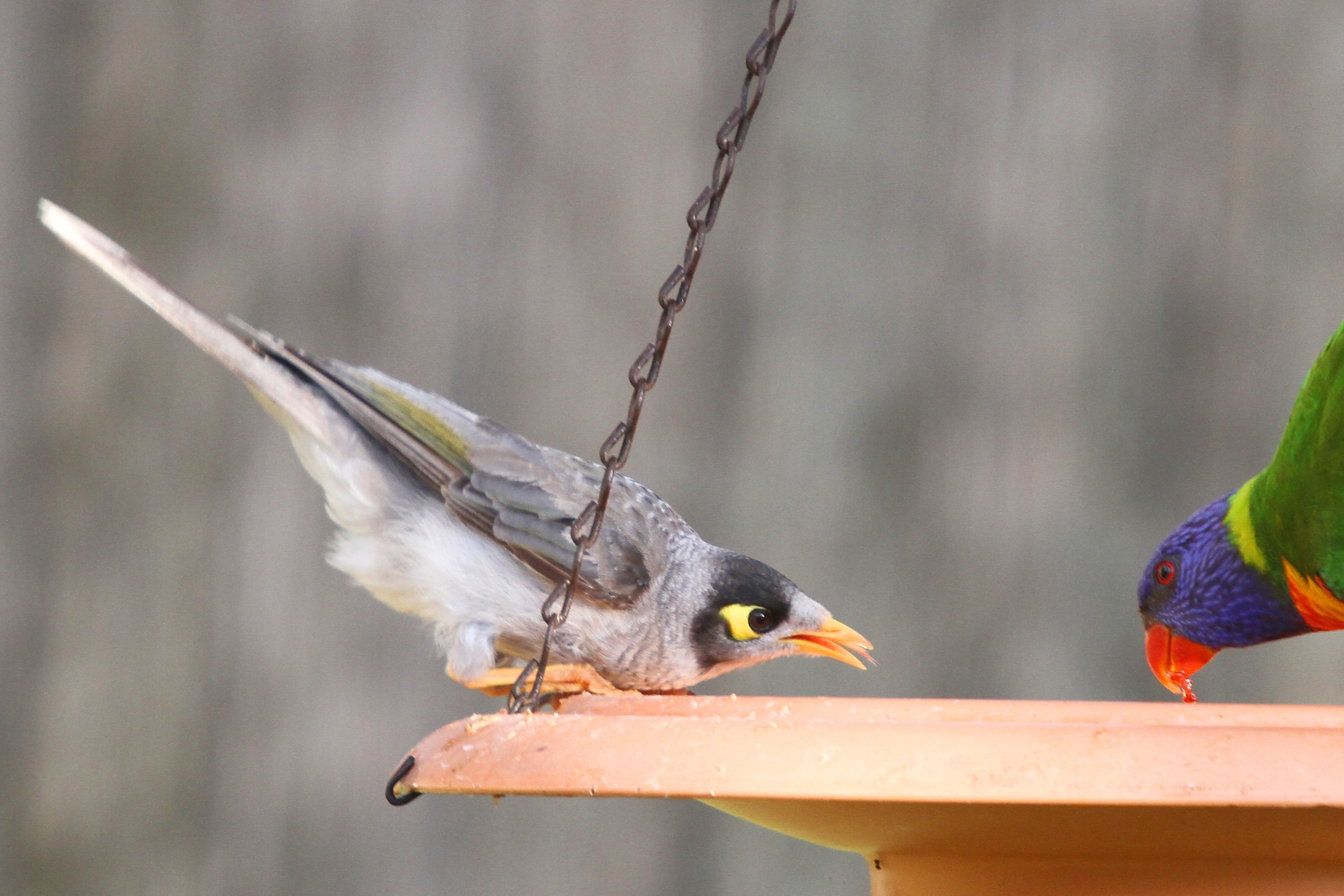
Pointing the bill is usually a warning signal.

Postural displays include tall and low poses, pointing, open-bill and wing-waving. The 'tall posture' is used when in close contact with another bird and is a mild threat. The bird holds itself upright with neck and legs stretched, and it faces the other bird. The 'low posture' is a submissive gesture; the bird sits low on a perch with legs obscured by fluffed feathers, and often faces away from the other bird. Fledglings threatened by adult birds will adopt a low posture and open their bill widely. 'Pointing' is a threat display where the bird stretches out horizontally, with feathers sleeked and the bill pointed at the target of the aggression. A bill snap will sometimes accompany pointing. An 'open-bill display' is used by subordinates in encounters between two birds, and by a female on the nest when other birds approach. The 'trident bill display' involves a fully open bill with the tongue raised and protruding, and is a higher-intensity submissive display. 'Wing-waving' is often performed at the same time as an open-bill display. The wings are flexed and held slightly away from the body, and flapped out and up around three to six times. Wing-waving may be accompanied by a yammer call. 'Eagle' displays involve holding the wings and tail spread out, in either a vertical or horizontal position.

Eye displays are made by exposing or covering the bare yellow patch behind the eye—when the feathers are completely sleeked the entire patch is visible, and when they are fluffed the patch is hidden. Eye displays are used in conjunction with postural displays, with the yellow patch fully displayed by dominant birds using threat postures, and immature birds tending to reduce the size of the eye-patch when under attack from other members of the coterie.

On occasion early in the breeding season, mass displays erupt, where twenty or thirty birds perform the various wing-spreading displays, short flights, and constant calling. Displaying birds are attacked by others, and groups of silent but agitated birds watch the interactions. Mass displays are more common in the early morning, can last for up to 40 minutes, and seem to be a combination of sexual and agonistic behaviour.

A 'corroboree' (from the word for a ceremonial meeting of Aboriginal Australians) is a group display, where birds converge on adjacent branches and simultaneously pose hunchbacked, giving wing-waving and open-bill displays, and the yammer call. A corroboree occurs when birds meet after a change in the social environment, such as a bird returning after an absence, or the repulsion of an intruder, or the coming together of different coteries. The corroboree appears to have a bonding function, and may involve all members of a colony.

==== Agonistic behaviour ====
Described as "always at war with others of the feathered kind" in early notes, the noisy miner is one of the most aggressive of the honeyeaters. Much of the activity within a noisy miner colony is agonistic with chasing, pecking, fighting, scolding, and mobbing occurring frequently throughout the day. The birds unite to attack predators and to defend the colony area against all other species of birds; the species is also highly aggressive intraspecifically.

Female noisy miners are aggressive towards each other, and one cause of a male-biased sex-ratio in colonies may be the females' greater intolerance for each other, driving immatures out of the colony and preventing the immigration of new females. Aggression at the nest is common between males. Adult males begin attacking juveniles when they are around 11 weeks old, and attackers can include males that previously cared for the fledgling. Adult females are less aggressive towards young birds, although mothers do occasionally attack their own offspring, and infanticide has been recorded. There is little male to female aggression other than the 'driving flights' that form part of the mating ritual. In direct attacks on young birds, pecks are directed at the eye-patch. Agonistic behaviour has been observed among nestlings, with aggression intensifying after fledging and at times resulting in the death of a sibling.

The noisy miner colony unites to mob inter-specific intruders and predators. The noisy miner will approach the threat closely and point, expose eye patches, and often bill-snap. Five to fifteen birds will fly around the intruder, some birds diving at it and either pulling away or striking the intruder. The mobbing continues until the intruder remains still, as with a tawny frogmouth (Podargus strigoides), or it leaves the area. Mobbing of snakes and goannas is particularly intense, and most species of bird, even non-predators, entering the territory are immediately chased. The noisy miner has been recorded attacking an Australian owlet-nightjar (Aegotheles cristatus) during the day, grebes, herons, ducks and cormorants on lakes at the edge of territories, crested pigeons (Ocyphaps lophotes), pardalotes, and rosellas. Non-predatory mammals such as bats, cattle, sheep, and wallabies are also attacked, though less vigorously than birds.

Noisy miner attacks are not limited to chasing the intruder, and aggressive incidents often result in the death of the trespasser. Reports include those of two noisy miners repeatedly pecking a house sparrow (Passer domesticus) at the base of its skull and killing it in six minutes; one noisy miner grasping a striated pardalote (Pardalotus striatus) by the wing, while another pecked it on the head until it died; and a sacred kingfisher (Todiramphus sanctus) being chased and harassed for over five hours, and then found dead with a fractured skull.

==== Response to threats ====
Noisy miners make louder alarm calls in noisier sections of urban environments, such as main roads. The most common initial response to alarm calls is to stay in the area and scan for threats, rather than withdraw. A study conducted in Melbourne and a nearby rural area found that noisy miners in urban areas were less likely to take flight, and when they did they flew shorter distances. It is unclear whether this is an adaptation or that bolder miners had been the ones to settle in the city. A field study in Canberra found that superb fairywrens (Malurus cyaneus) that lived in areas frequented by noisy miners recognised miner alarm calls and took flight, and had learnt to ignore their non-alarm calls, while those that live in areas not frequented by noisy miners did not respond to miner alarm calls. This suggests that the species has adapted and learnt to discriminate and respond to another species' vocalisations.

=== Breeding ===
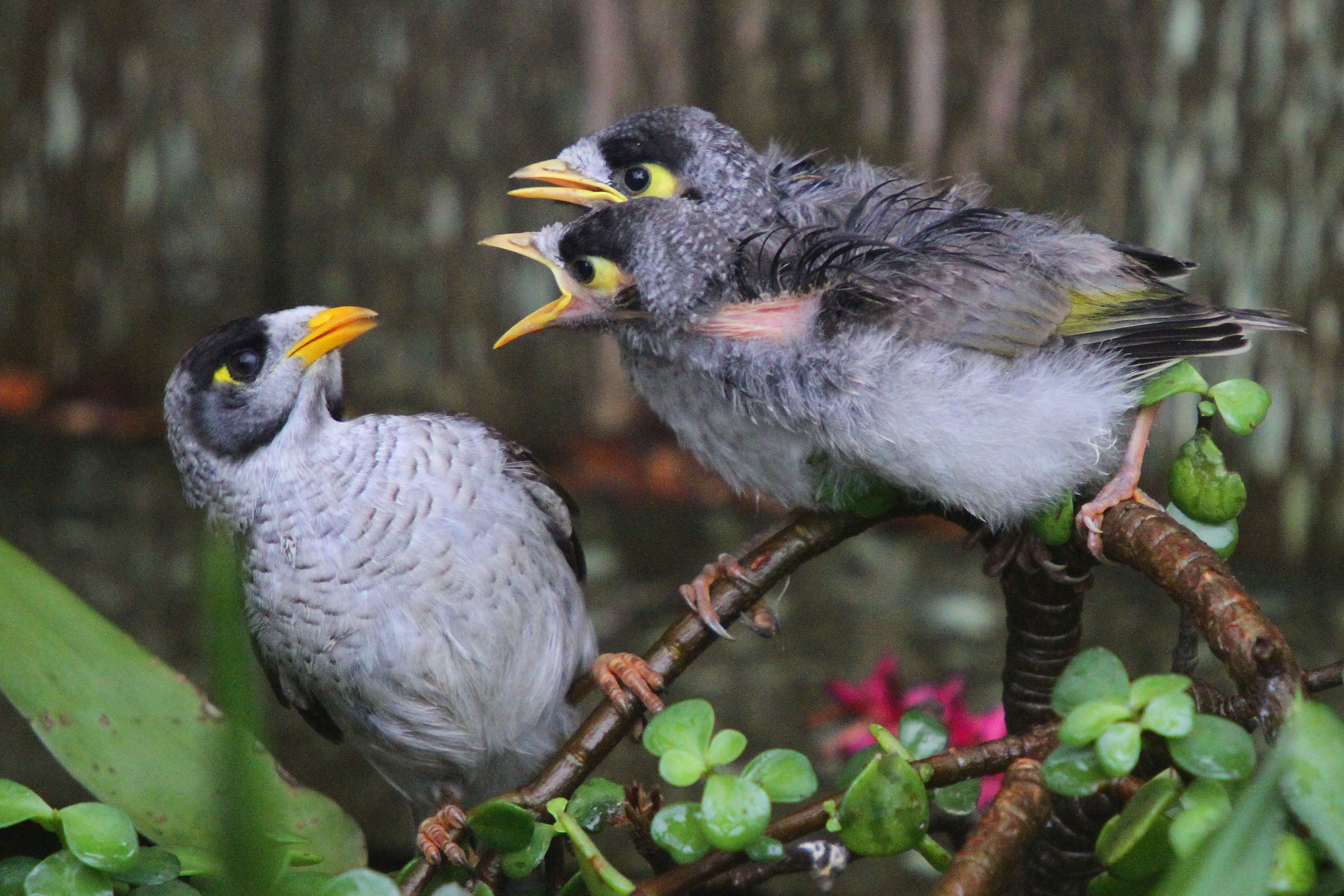
Fledglings demand to be fed by any nearby adult.

The noisy miner does not use a stereotyped courtship display; displays can involve 'driving', where the male jumps or flies at the female from 1–2 metres (3.3–6.6 ft) away, and if she moves away he pursues her aggressively. The female may perform a 'bowed-wing display', where the wings and tail are spread and quivered, with the wings arched and the head pointing down. The male may adopt a vertical or horizontal 'eagle display', with wings and tail spread wide and held still for several seconds. Copulation is frequent and conspicuous, with both males and females copulating with several birds, while other members of the colony display or otherwise interfere with the mating pair. Copulation usually occurs on larger, exposed branches close to the nest site and can occur at any time of the day, although slightly more often between 11:00 and 13:00, when communal activities are less frequent. The frenzied courtship activity had led to speculation that the female mates promiscuously to recruit males to help care for the young, but recent genetic testing shows that 96.5% of noisy miner broods result from monogamous mating and that multiple paternity is rare. An observation of banded birds noted that while females copulated repeatedly, it was always with the same male. Mate switching between broods is uncommon, with pairs staying together over several years.

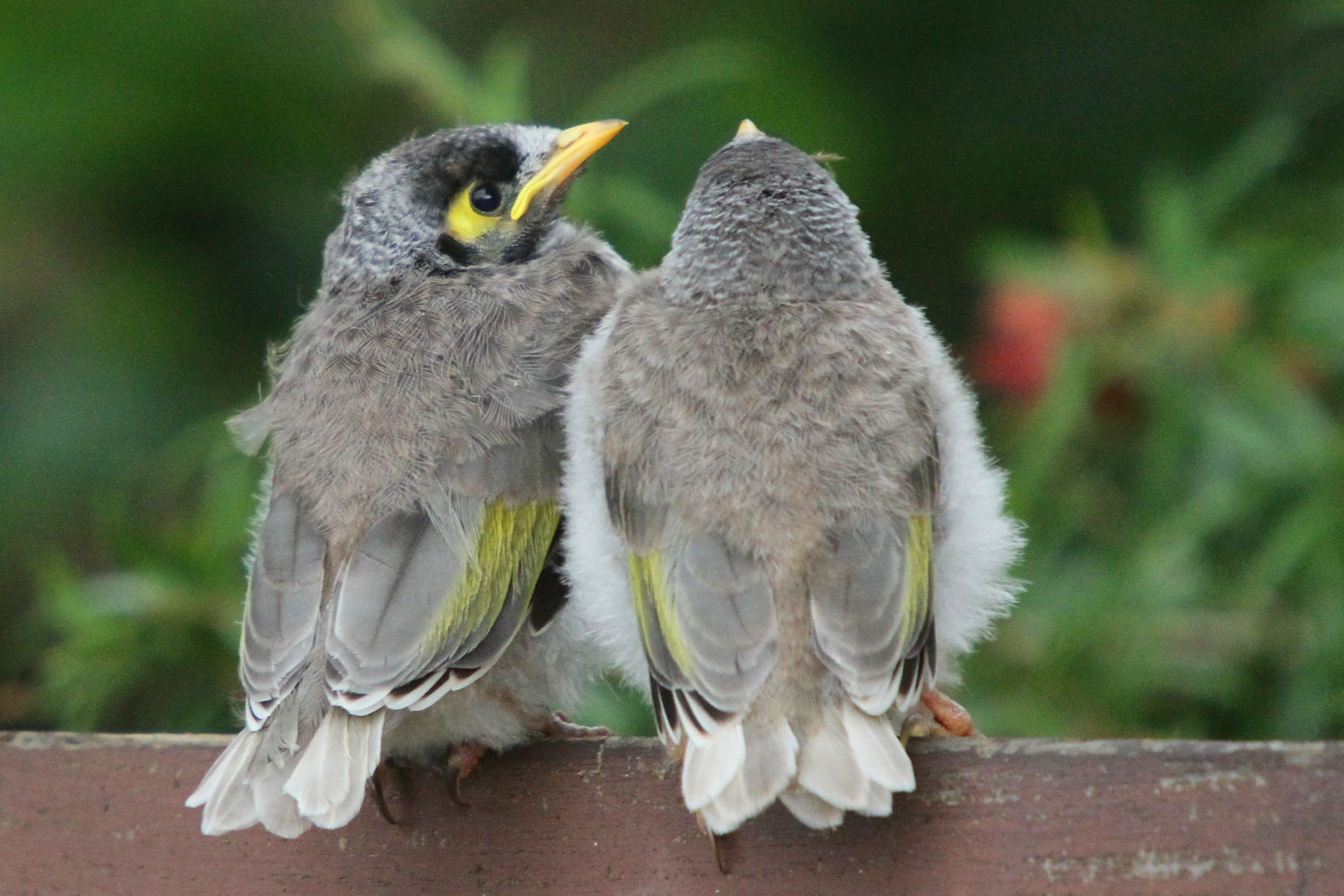
Fledged siblings huddle together.

The noisy miner breeds all year long, with most activity from July through November, though the peak period is subject to seasonal variations, with sharp peaks in laying activity when conditions are particularly favourable for raising young. The nest is built in prickly or leafy trees, and the noisy miner is often recorded nesting in eucalypts, and also in wattles, Araucaria, Banksia, Bursaria, Hibiscus, mistletoe, Melaleuca, Pittosporum, Schinus, and jacaranda. It seems to prefer moderately dense foliage for nesting, often near the end of drooping horizontal branches. Support for the nest may be the primary criterion of a suitable nest site, rather than characteristics of the vegetation or location. The female alone builds the nest, which is deep and cup-shaped, woven of twigs and grasses with other plant material, animal hair and spider webs. Occasionally, the nest will include man-made materials such as twine, scraps of material, and tissue paper. It is lined with wool, hair, feathers, flowers or plant down, and padded with a circular mat woven from fibres pulled from the cocoons of the processional caterpillar. The female noisy miner walks around on the ground close to the nest site, picking up material. She gathers material from disused nests of other birds, or dismantles its most recent nest to build a new one. The female completes the nest in five or six days. On average, nests have an external diameter of 15–17.8 centimetres (5.9–7.0 in) and an external depth of 9–11.4 centimetres (3.5–4.5 in). The internal depth of the nest is around 5.5 centimetres (2.2 in).

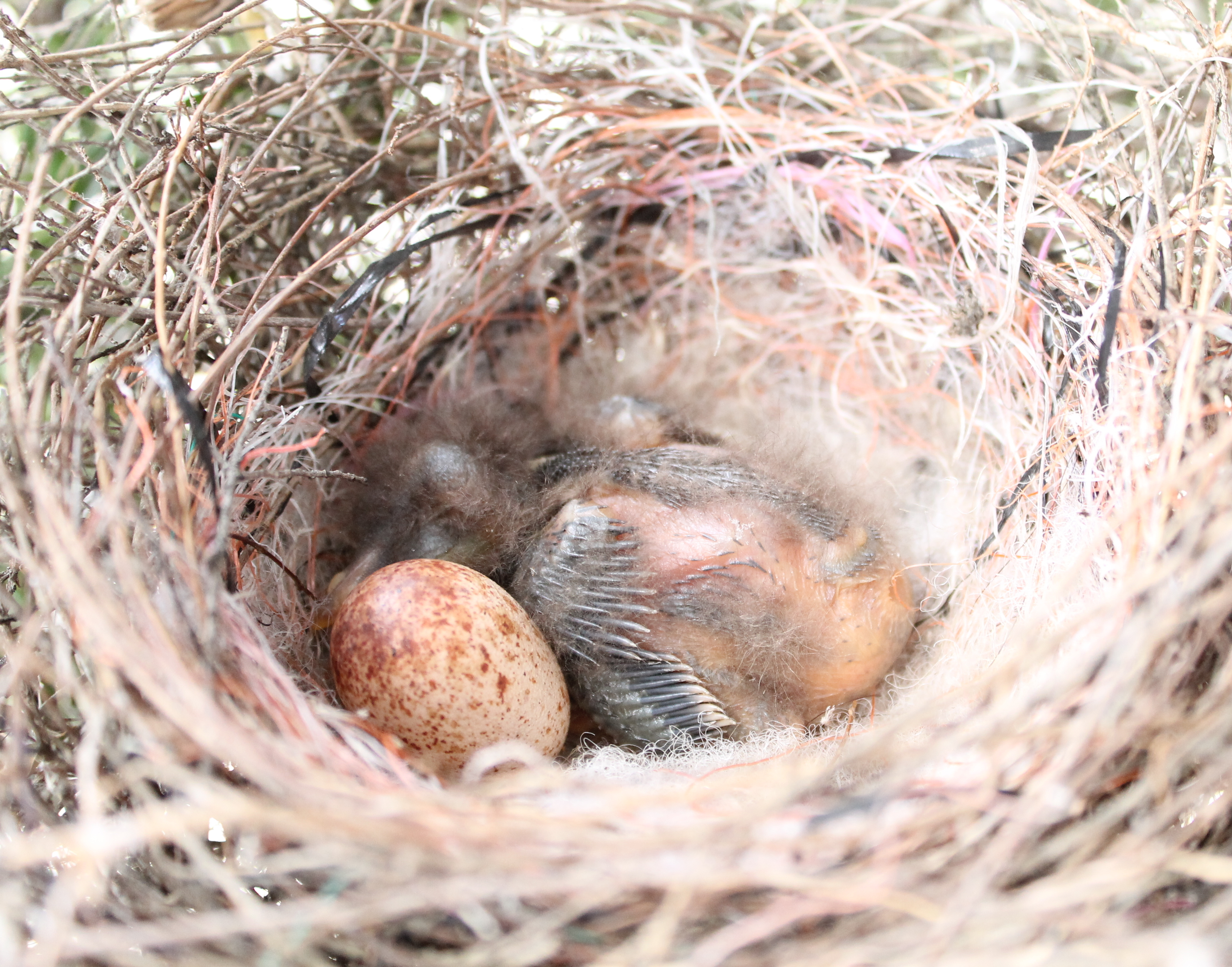
Newly hatched chick and egg

Eggs vary greatly in size, shape and markings, but are generally elongated ovals; white to cream or pinkish or buff coloured; freckled, spotted or blotched with reddish brown to chestnut or a purplish red, sometimes with underlying markings of violet or purplish grey. The clutch consists of two to four eggs. Incubation is by the female only, and the incubation period is around sixteen days. Hatching is asynchronous, with up to six days being recorded between the hatching of the first and last chicks in a clutch. Young are naked at hatching, and develop a cover of down within two to three days. The fledging period is around sixteen days, and young begin to find food for themselves between twenty-six and thirty days after fledging, but are still regularly fed by adults to thirty-five days. The young leave the nest before they are fully fledged, and only able to fly downwards, and scramble up. They do not go far from the nest, return to it at night, and take some weeks to completely leave the nest. Many fledglings are found on the ground and in low shrubs during this period, where they continue to be cared for until they can make their way up into the trees. These birds are often mistakenly 'rescued'. The fledglings seek out siblings if separated, and huddle together for up to three weeks after fledging.

The noisy miner has some of the largest group sizes of any communally breeding bird, with up to twenty males and one female attending a single brood. Only males help with a nest, and while many birds may be associated with a particular brood, some males devote all their time to a single nest, while others spread their helping efforts across five or six nests. Behavioural evidence and genetic testing indicate that helpers are male offspring of the breeding pair, or full siblings of the male parent. Males nearly always bring food to the nestling singly, and if several arrive at once, one will pass food to a nestling while the others wait. The female leaves the nest quickly when a male bird arrives, and never takes food from one of the helpers. Communal feeding of the young increases after fledging, and the young beg for food with constant 'chip chip' calls and gaping mouths. The female rarely feeds the young birds after they have fledged.

==== Nest predation ====
Cooperative breeding has been described as a strategy for decreasing nest predation, although one study found no relationship between the number of helpers visiting a nest site and its success or failure. Noisy miners were seen to have a range of strategies to increase their breeding success, including multiple broods, laying eggs early in the season, nesting low in the canopy and group mobbing of predators; these measures did not guarantee against nest failure, due to the diversity of potential predators in the noisy miner's open woodland habitat.

=== Feeding ===
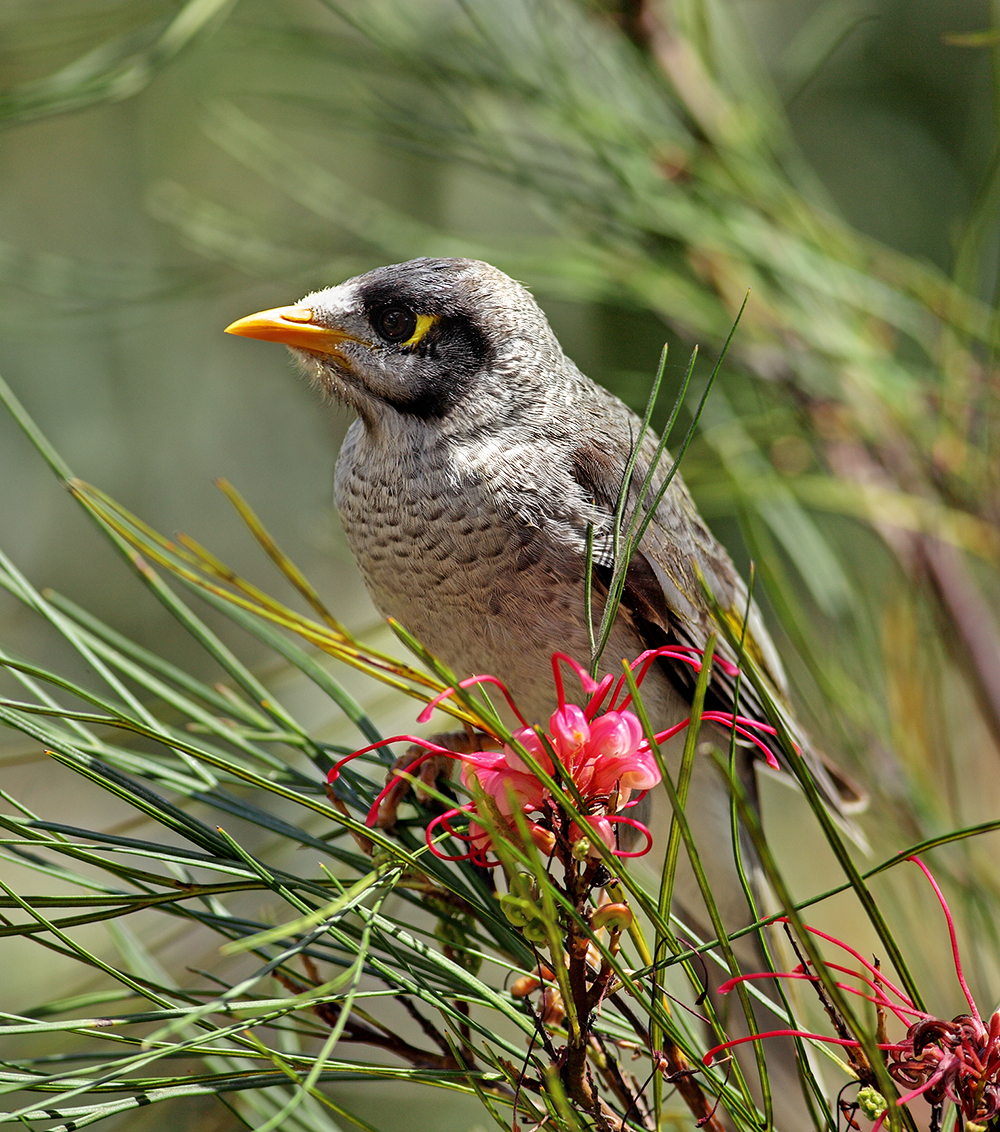
Cultivated grevilleas are a key urban food source.

The noisy miner primarily eats nectar, fruit, and insects, and occasionally it feeds on small reptiles or amphibians. It is both arboreal and terrestrial, feeding in the canopy of trees, on trunks and branches, and on the ground. It forages within the colony's territory throughout the year, usually in groups of five to eight birds, although hundreds may gather at a stand of flowering trees, such as banksia. The noisy miner collects nectar directly from flowers, hanging upside down or straddling thin branches acrobatically to access the nectar; it takes fruit from trees or fallen on the ground; gleans or hawks for invertebrates; and picks through leaf litter for insects. It has been recorded turning over the dried droppings of emu (Dromaius novaehollandiae) and eastern grey kangaroo (Macropus giganteus), searching for insects.

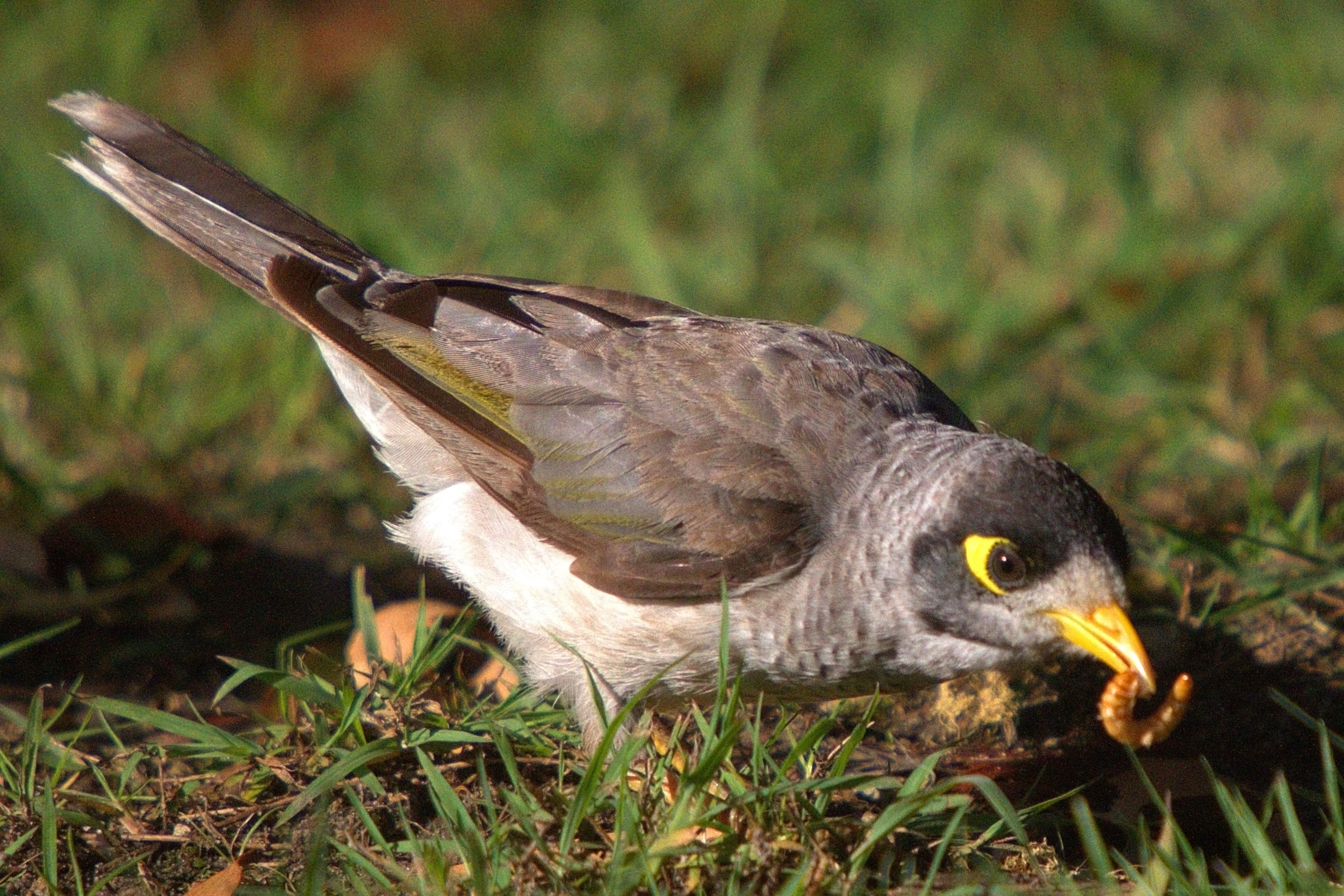
An immature bird (with brownish feathers) eats a mealworm.

In a study of birds foraging in suburban gardens, the noisy miner was seen to spend more time in banksia, grevillea and eucalypt species, and when in flower, callistemon, than in other plants including exotics. Most time was spent gleaning the foliage of eucalypts, and noisy miners were significantly more abundant in sites where eucalypts were present. The noisy miner can meet most of its nutritional needs from manna, honeydew, and lerp gathered from the foliage of eucalypts. Lower numbers of noisy miner were recorded at banksias and grevilleas than other large honeyeaters, such as little wattlebird (Anthochaera chrysoptera) and red wattlebird (Anthochaera carunculata).

Detailed studies of the diet of the noisy miner record it eating a range of foods including: spiders; insects (leaf beetles, ladybirds, stink bugs, ants, moth and butterfly larvae); nectar (from Jacaranda mimosifolia, Erythrina variegata, Lagunaria patersonia, Callistemon salignus, Callistemon viminalis, eucalypts Argyle apple, sugar gum, yellow gum, grey ironbark, and grey gum, Banksia ericifolia, B. integrifolia, B. serrata, Grevillea aspleniifolia, G. banksii, G. hookeriana, G. juniperina, G. rosmarinifolia, and flowering quince); seeds from oats, wheat and pepper tree; fruit from saltbush, mistletoe and crabapple; frogs and skinks; and other matter, such as bread, pieces of meat and cheese, and food scraps.

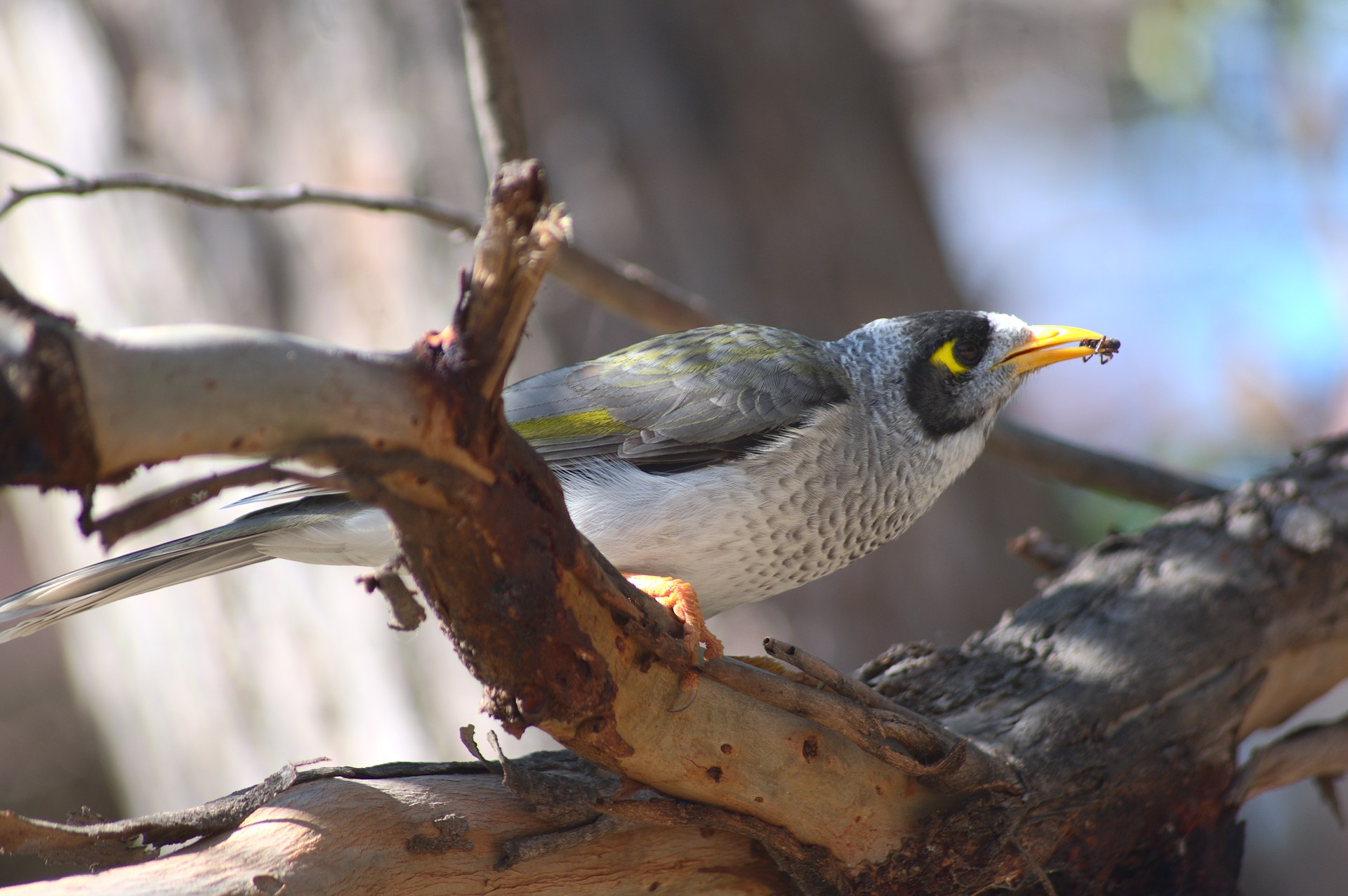
Noisy miner catching an ant on Raymond Island, Victoria, Australia

In the first study to demonstrate different learning techniques in a single species, the noisy miner was found to employ different cognitive strategies, depending upon the resource it was foraging. When searching for nectar, which does not move but is readily depleted, the noisy miner uses a spatial memory-based strategy, identifying characteristics of the environment—a strategy that is efficient in new environments and is not affected by changes in the bird's activities. When searching for invertebrates, it appears to employ a different strategy based on learned rules of insect movement (they improve at finding invertebrates with practice). The two different strategies imply the existence of adapted cognitive mechanisms, capable of responding appropriately to different foraging contexts.

== Conservation status ==
Abundant throughout its significant range, the noisy miner is considered of least concern for conservation, and its extreme population densities in some areas actually constitute a threat to other species. The strong correlation between the presence of noisy miners and the absence of avian diversity has been well documented. The role played by the noisy miner in the steep decline of many woodland birds, its impact on endangered species with similar foraging requirements, and the level of leaf damage leading to die-back that accompanies the exclusion of insectivorous birds from remnant woodlands, means that any strategy to restore avian diversity will need to take account of the management of noisy miner populations. Some habitat restoration and revegetation projects have inadvertently increased the problem of the noisy miner by establishing the open eucalypt habitat that they prefer. A focus of many regeneration projects has been the establishing of habitat corridors that connect patches of remnant forest, and the use of eucalypts as fast-growing nurse species. Both practices have sound ecological value, but allow the noisy miner to proliferate, so conservation efforts are being modified by planting a shrubby understory with the eucalypts, and avoiding the creation of narrow protrusions, corners or clumps of trees in vegetation corridors. A field study conducted in the Southern Highlands found that noisy miners tended to avoid areas dominated by wattles, species of which in the study area had bipinnate leaves. Hence the authors proposed that revegetation projects include at least 15% Acacia species with bipinnate leaves if possible, as well as shrubby understory plants.

Translocation of noisy miners is unlikely to be a solution to their overabundance in remnant habitats. In a Victorian study where birds were banded and relocated, colonies moved into the now unpopulated area, but soon returned to their original territories. The translocated birds did not settle in a new territory. They were not assimilated into resident populations of miners, but instead wandered up to 4.2 kilometres (2.6 mi) from the release point, moving through apparently suitable habitat occupied by other miners—at least for the first 50 days following translocation. Two birds with radio tracking devices travelled 18 kilometres (11 mi) back to their site of capture. Although noisy miners are protected across Australia, and a permit is required to cull them, culling has been proposed as the most humane and practical method of reducing their impact, particularly where combined with rehabilitation of the habitat to suit a wider variety of bird life. An unsanctioned cull took place on private rural property over 1991 and 1992, which, combined with extensive and dense plantings of native trees, reportedly resulted in an increase in species diversity.
