= Meta noise =

Erroneous metadata

Meta noise is inaccurate or irrelevant metadata. It is particularly prevalent in systems with a schema not based on a controlled vocabulary, such as certain folksonomies.

Examples:

- misspelled tags (wihte instead of white), or tags with multiple spellings (hip-hop and hip hop)
- obviously inaccurate or joke tags (dog on a content object featuring only a cat)
- on systems open to large user groups, tags which are understood by only a minority of users.

== Hidden benefit ==
Although the existence of meta noise may initially appear to detract from the value of metadata generally, meta noise allows less popular tags to be defined and used by a minority of users without damaging the validity or cohesion of what the majority of users would consider to be the most relevant or accurate metadata, thus actually increasing access to content.
