= List of Crinum species =

As of July 2014, the World Checklist of Selected Plant Families lists 105 species of Crinum:

- Crinum abyssinicum Hochst. ex A.Rich. – N.E. Tropical Africa
- Crinum acaule Baker – KwaZulu-Natal
- Crinum album (Forssk.) Herb. – S.W. Arabian Pen
- Crinum amazonicum Ravenna – N. Brazil
- Crinum americanum L. – S.E. U.S.A. to Mexico, W. Caribbean
- Crinum amoenum Ker Gawl. ex Roxb. – Central Himalaya to Myanmar
- Crinum amphibium Bjorå & Nordal – Cameroon
- Crinum angustifolium L.
- Crinum arenarium Herb. – N. Australia
- Crinum asiaticum L. – Indian Ocean, Tropical & Subtropical Asia to S.W. Pacific
- Crinum aurantiacum Lehmiller – Zambia to N. Malawi
- Crinum bakeri K.Schum. – N.W. Pacific
- Crinum balfourii Baker – Socotra
- Crinum bambusetum Nordal & Sebsebe – W. Ethiopia to Sudan
- Crinum belleymei Hérincq – Paraguay
- Crinum biflorum Rottb. – W. Tropical Africa to Sudan
- Crinum binghamii Nordal & Kwembeya – W. Zambia
- Crinum brachynema Herb. – W. India
- Crinum braunii Harms – Madagascar
- Crinum brevilobatum McCue – Central America
- Crinum bulbispermum (Burm.f.) Milne-Redh. & Schweick. – S. Africa
- Crinum buphanoides Welw. ex Baker – S. Tropical & S. Africa
- Crinum calamistratum Bogner & Heine – Cameroon
- Crinum campanulatum Herb. – E. Cape Province
- Crinum carolo-schmidtii Dinter – Caprivi Strip to N. Botswana
- Crinum crassicaule Baker – S. Tropical & S. Africa
- Crinum darienense Woodson – Panama
- Crinum eleonorae Blatt. & McCann – W. India
- Crinum erubescens L.f. ex Aiton – Mexico to S. Tropical America
- Crinum erythrophyllum Carey ex Herb. – Myanmar
- Crinum filifolium H.Perrier – W. Madagascar
- Crinum fimbriatulum Baker – Angola
- Crinum firmifolium Baker – Madagascar
- Crinum flaccidum Herb. – W., Central & E. Australia
- Crinum forgetii C.H.Wright – Peru
- Crinum giessii Lehmiller – Namibia
- Crinum glaucum A.Chev. – W. Tropical Africa to Uganda
- Crinum gracile G.Mey. ex C.Presl – Malesia to New Guinea
- Crinum graciliflorum Kunth & C.D.Bouché – Colombia to N. Venezuela
- Crinum graminicola I.Verd. – Northern Province to KwaZulu-Natal
- Crinum hanitrae Lehmiller & Sisk – Madagascar
- Crinum hardyi Lehmiller – Madagascar
- Crinum harmsii Baker – N.W. Zambia to Namibia
- Crinum hildebrandtii Vatke – Comoros
- Crinum humile Herb. – India
- Crinum jagus (J.Thomps.) Dandy – Tropical Africa
- Crinum jasonii Bjorå & Nordal – S.E. Zambia
- Crinum kirkii Baker – E. Tropical Africa to Mozambique
- Crinum kunthianum M.Roem. – Central America to Ecuador
- Crinum latifolium L. – India to S. China.
- Crinum lavrani Lehmiller – Madagascar
- Crinum lineare L.f. – E. Cape Province
- Crinum longitubum Pax – Angola
- Crinum lorifolium Roxb. – India, Myanmar
- Crinum lugardiae N.E.Br. – S. Africa
- Crinum macowanii Baker – Eritrea to S. Africa, Seychelles
- Crinum majakallense Baker – Angola
- Crinum malabaricum Lekhak & S.R.Yadav – India (Kerala)
- Crinum mauritianum G.Lodd. – Mauritius (Barrage de Midlands)
- Crinum mccoyi Lehmiller – Madagascar
- Crinum minimum Milne-Redh. – Tanzania to S. Tropical Africa
- Crinum modestum Baker – N.W. Madagascar
- Crinum moorei Hook.f. – E. Cape Province to KwaZulu-Natal
- Crinum natans Baker – W. & W. Central Tropical Africa
- Crinum nordaliae Mabb. – Angola
- Crinum nubicum L.S.Hannibal – W. Tropical Africa to Chad
- Crinum oliganthum Urb. – Central Cuba
- Crinum ornatum (Aiton) Herb. – Tropical Africa to Namibia
- Crinum paludosum Verd. – S. Tropical & S. Africa
- Crinum palustre Urb. – Haiti
- Crinum papillosum Nordal – S.W. Tanzania to N. Zambia
- Crinum parvibulbosum Dinter ex Overkott – Namibia
- Crinum parvum Baker – Mozambique
- Crinum piliferum Nordal – N. Kenya
- Crinum politifolium R.Wahlstr. – Tanzania
- Crinum pronkii Lehmiller – Madagascar
- Crinum purpurascens Herb. – W. Tropical Africa to Sudan and Angola
- Crinum pusillum Herb. – Nicobar Is
- Crinum rautanenianum Schinz – Zambia to N. Botswana
- Crinum razafindratsiraea LehMill. – Madagascar
- Crinum roperense Lehmiller & Lykos – Northern Territory
- Crinum salsum Ravenna – Brazil (Rio de Janeiro)
- Crinum scillifolium A.Chev. – W. Tropical Africa
- Crinum serrulatum Baker – Cambodia
- Crinum stapfianum Kraenzl. – W. Central Brazil
- Crinum stenophyllum Baker – Myanmar
- Crinum stracheyi Baker – Uttarakhand
- Crinum stuhlmannii Baker – Somalia to S. Africa
- Crinum subcernuum Baker – S.E. Tanzania to N. Botswana
- Crinum surinamense Ravenna – Suriname
- Crinum thaianum J.Schulze – Thailand
- Crinum trifidum Nordal – Angola
- Crinum undulatum Hook. – Brazil to N. Peru
- Crinum uniflorum F.Muell. – N. Australia
- Crinum variabile (Jacq.) Herb. – Cape Province
- Crinum venosum R.Br. – N. Northern Territory to N. Queensland
- Crinum verdoorniae Lehmiller – S. Tropical Africa to Caprivi Strip
- Crinum virgineum Mart. ex Schult. & Schult.f. – S.E. Brazil
- Crinum viviparum (Lam.) R.Ansari & V.J.Nair – Indian Subcontinent to Indo-China
- Crinum walteri Overkott – S. Tropical & S. Africa
- Crinum wattii Baker – Assam to Thailand
- Crinum welwitschii Baker – Angola
- Crinum wimbushi Worsley – Malawi
- Crinum woodrowii Baker – India (Maharashtra: Kates Point)
- Crinum xerophilum H.Perrier ex Lehmiller – S.W. Madagascar
- Crinum zeylanicum (L.) L. – Seychelles, S.W. India, Sri Lanka
