= Murray-Sunset National Park =

National park in Australia

- IUCN category II (national park)
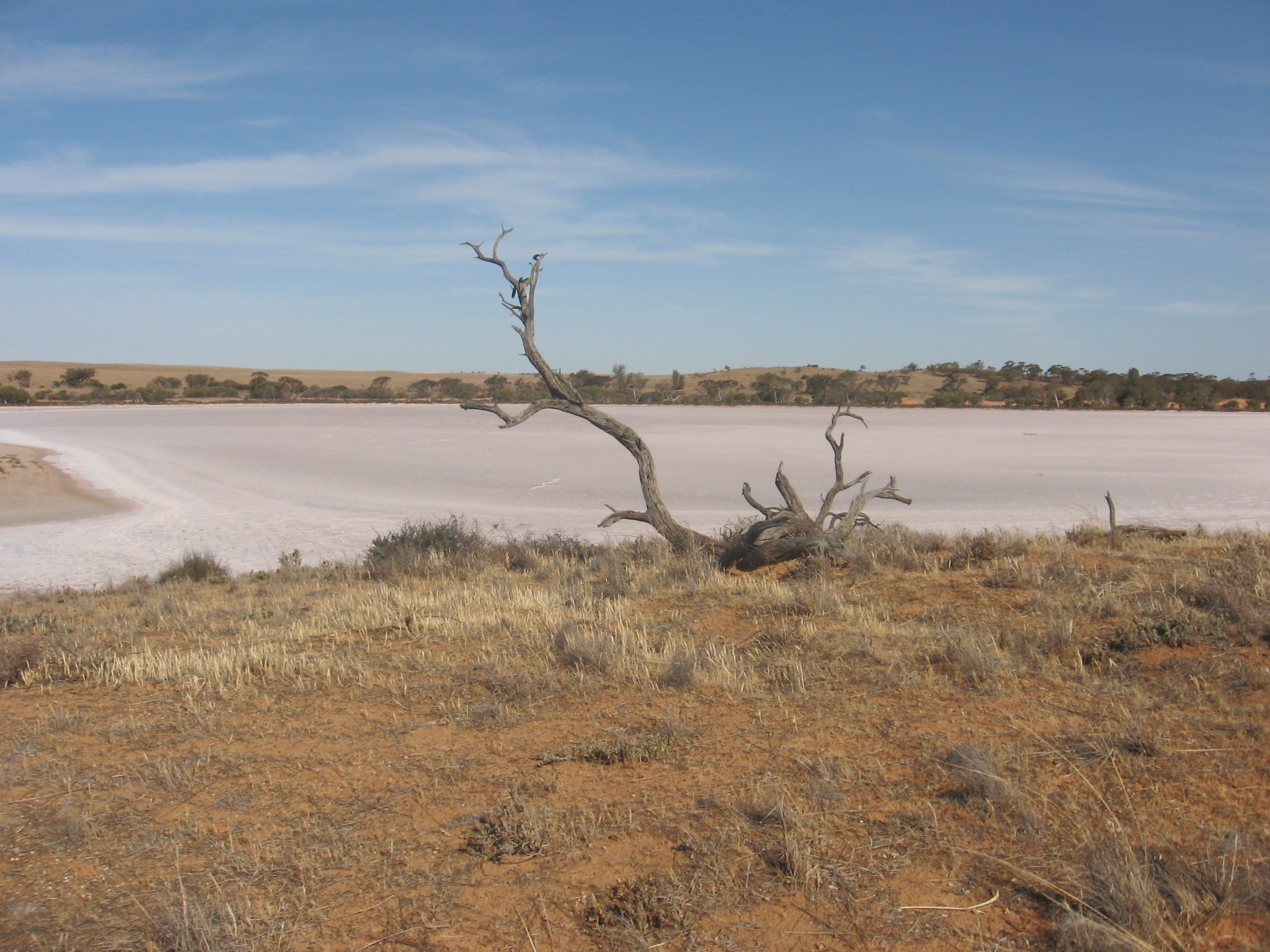
- Pink Lakes (salt lakes) in the national park.

- Location within Victoria
- Location: Victoria
- Nearest city: Mildura
- Coordinates: 34°46′06″S 141°51′15″E
- Area: 6,330 km^{2} (2,440 sq mi)
- Established: 1991
- Governing body: Parks Victoria
- Website: Official website

The Murray-Sunset National Park is the second largest national park in Victoria, Australia, located in the Mallee district in the northwestern corner of the state, bordering South Australia. The 633,000-hectare (1,560,000-acre) national park is situated approximately 440 kilometres (270 mi) northwest of Melbourne and was proclaimed in 1991. It is in the northwestern corner of the state, bordering South Australia to the west and the Murray River to the north. The Sturt Highway passes through the northern part of the park, but most of the park is in the remote area between the Sturt Highway and the Mallee Highway, west of the Calder Highway.

== History ==
The park was created in 1991, and expanded to encompass Pink Lakes State Park in 1999. The lakes are dubbed "pink" after the beta-carotene pigment that colours it in late summer, caused by the algae Dunaliella salina. This area was the site of a major salt industry from 1916 to 1975. At its peak, ten thousand tons of salt was harvested and railed from Lake Crosbie, Lake Becking and Lake Kenyon to the nearby town of Linga. For management purposes, the Murray-Sunset National Park is managed with the Hattah-Kulkyne National Park, Wyperfeld National Park, Lake Albacutya Park and Murray-Kulkyne Park as part of the Victorian Mallee Parks.

Another defunct railway, the Nowingi line, terminates at the remains of a gypsum mine hopper on the Raak Plain. Other historical relics include Shearer's Quarters and Mopoke Hut, built as grazier accommodation in the 1960s.

== Flora and fauna ==
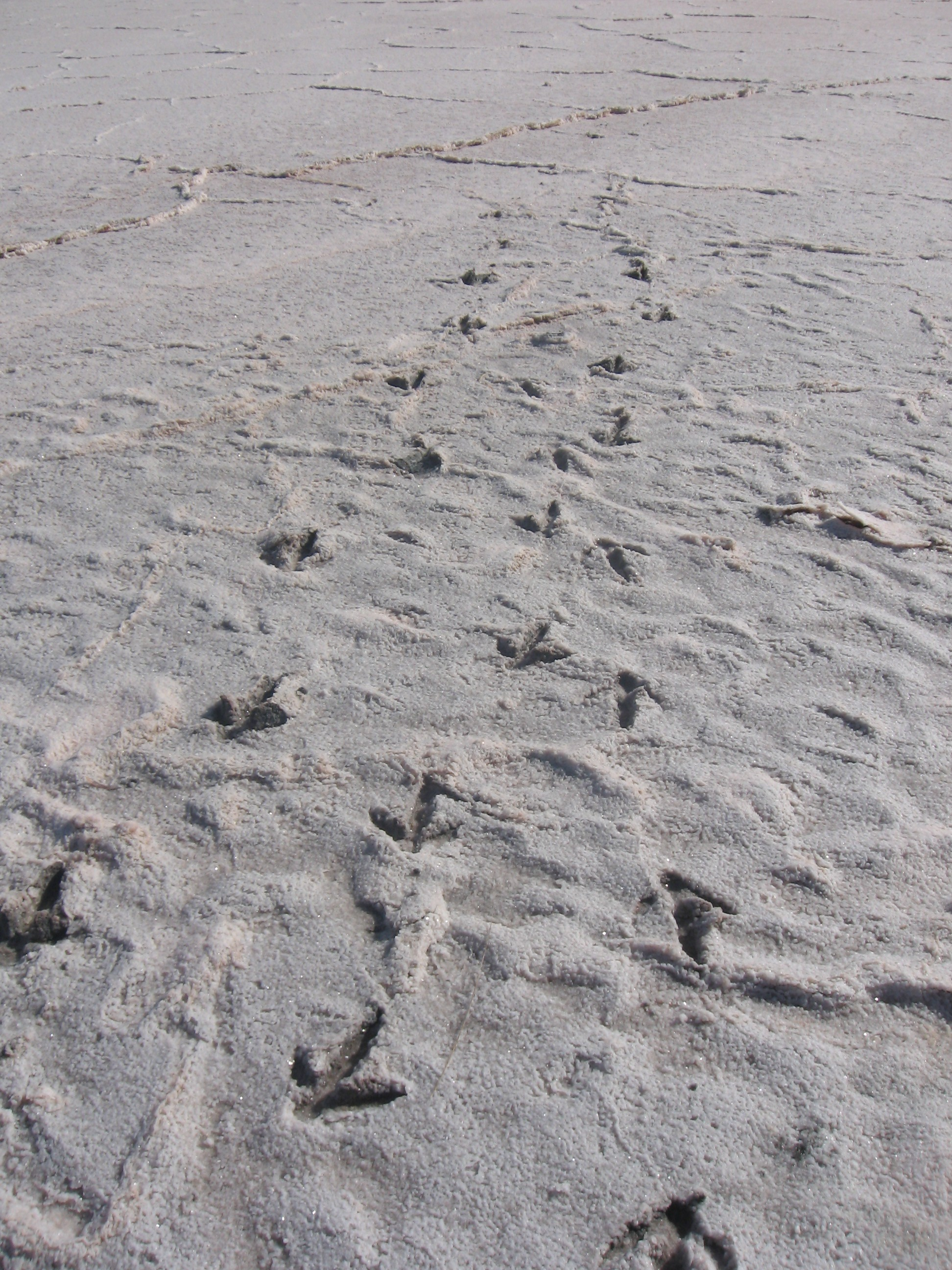
Emu tracks on salt lake in Murray Sunset NP

Over 600 species of plants have been recorded, and 300 species of birds. Notable plants include Murray lily, silvery emu-bush, saltbush, buloke, porcupine grass, blue-leaved mallee and other mallee eucalypts. In spring, wildflowers include spider orchids, azure sun orchids, desert heath-myrtles and poached-egg daisies.

Emus, wedge-tailed eagles, and both western grey and red kangaroos are present.

=== Important Bird Area ===
Most of the park lies within the Murray-Sunset, Hattah and Annuello Important Bird Area (IBA), so identified by BirdLife International because it contains mallee habitat supporting a suite of threatened mallee bird species, including the malleefowl, black-eared miner and mallee emu-wren.

== Attractions ==
The park is attractive to bushwalkers as the nearest semi-arid region to Melbourne. Walks include circuits of Lake Crosbie and Lake Kenyon, and the three-day Sunset walking track. Groundwater is scarce, and hikers generally rely on water tanks maintained by rangers.

The Pink Lakes are medium-sized salt lakes. In late summer a red pigment, carotene, is secreted from the alga Dunaliella salina and gives a distinct pink colour to the lakes.

== See also ==
- Protected areas of Victoria
- List of national parks of Australia
