= Gluepot Reserve =

Protected area in South Australia

- IUCN category III (natural monument or feature)
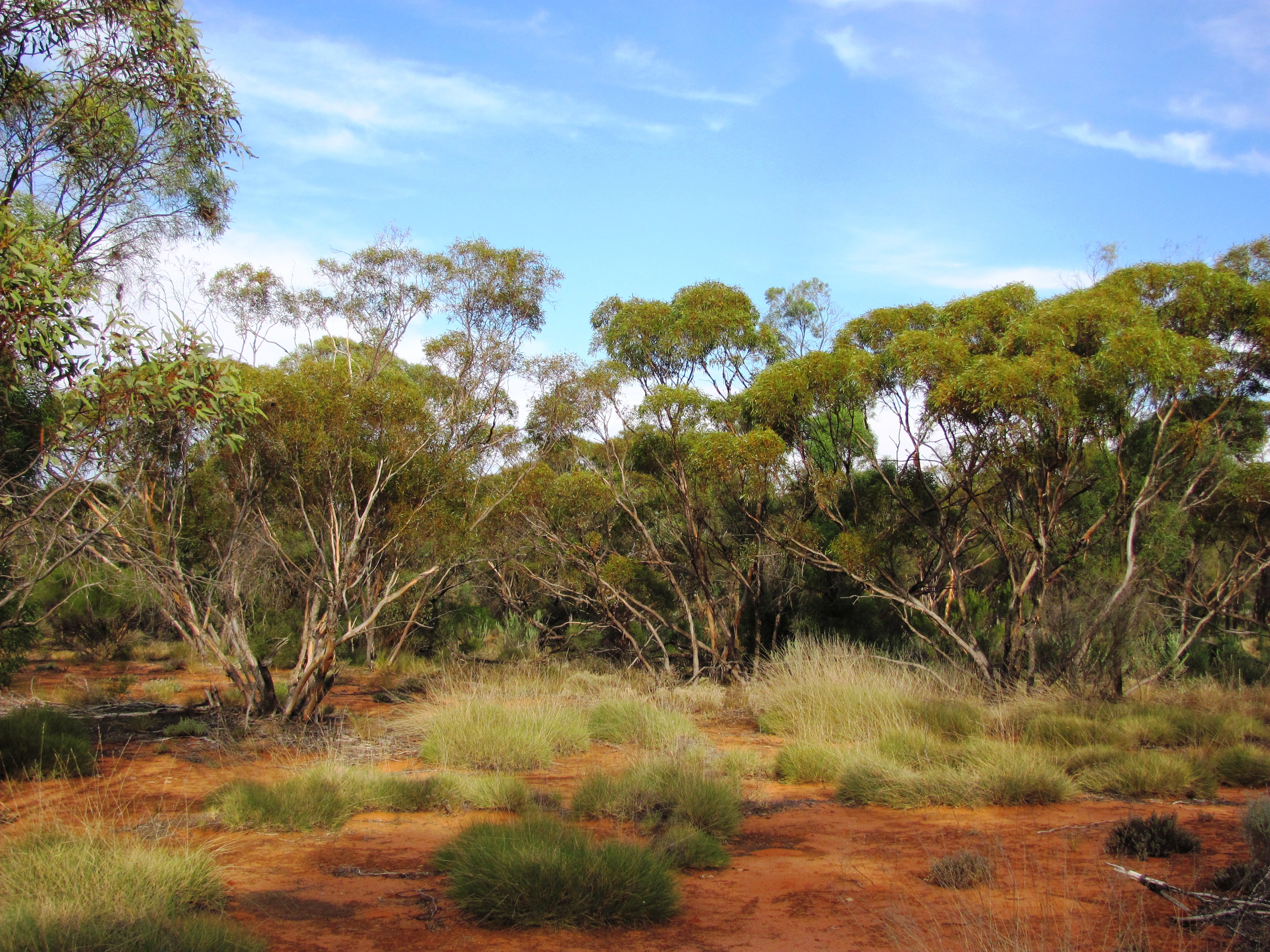
- Vegetation at Gluepot Reserve, South Australia

- Location within South Australia
- Location: South Australia
- Nearest city: Waikerie
- Coordinates: 33°45′23.75″S 140°14′47.39″E
- Area: 541.16 km^{2} (208.94 sq mi)
- Established: 27 June 2000
- Governing body: BirdLife Australia
- Website: Official website

Gluepot Reserve is a private protected area located in the Australian state of South Australia in the gazetted locality of Gluepot about 40 kilometres (25 miles) north of the town of Waikerie.

== History ==
Gluepot was established by Birds Australia (now BirdLife Australia) in 1997, by purchase, through a public appeal, of Gluepot Station, a pastoral lease with an area of 540 square kilometres (210 square miles) in the semi-arid Murray Mallee region of South Australia. The decision to purchase Gluepot Station, Birds Australia's first reserve, was taken to protect its outstanding floral and fauna values, under threat because of an application by the lessee to burn the property to provide grazing for sheep.

== Birds ==
Nearly 200 species of birds have been recorded at Gluepot Reserve. These include the nationally threatened malleefowl, regent parrot, red-lored whistler, and black-eared miner. A further 33 species are considered to be regionally threatened. Scarlet-chested parrots are known to have bred on Gluepot in the past, and still visit the reserve.

== Conservation ==
Gluepot Reserve has a protected area status due to being the subject of a native vegetation heritage agreement created under the Native Vegetation Act 1991 (SA) where its owner, BirdLife Australia, has agreed to protect the property's native vegetation in perpetuity. It is classified as an IUCN Category III protected area, and lies within both the Riverland Biosphere Reserve and the Riverland Mallee Important Bird Area.

== Climate ==
Climate data for Gluepot Reserve, elevation 57 m (187 ft), (1999–2025 normals and extremes)
Month	Jan	Feb	Mar	Apr	May	Jun	Jul	Aug	Sep	Oct	Nov	Dec	Year
Record high °C (°F)	46.9 (116.4)	47.5 (117.5)	42.5 (108.5)	40.0 (104.0)	31.1 (88.0)	26.5 (79.7)	27.0 (80.6)	31.2 (88.2)	38.0 (100.4)	41.0 (105.8)	45.0 (113.0)	48.6 (119.5)	48.6 (119.5)
Mean daily maximum °C (°F)	34.0 (93.2)	32.8 (91.0)	29.5 (85.1)	24.9 (76.8)	20.5 (68.9)	17.2 (63.0)	17.1 (62.8)	19.1 (66.4)	22.7 (72.9)	25.9 (78.6)	29.1 (84.4)	31.7 (89.1)	25.4 (77.7)
Mean daily minimum °C (°F)	16.0 (60.8)	15.2 (59.4)	12.4 (54.3)	8.6 (47.5)	5.9 (42.6)	4.2 (39.6)	3.7 (38.7)	4.4 (39.9)	6.5 (43.7)	8.8 (47.8)	12.0 (53.6)	13.9 (57.0)	9.3 (48.7)
Record low °C (°F)	6.0 (42.8)	6.0 (42.8)	3.1 (37.6)	−2.0 (28.4)	−5.5 (22.1)	−6.7 (19.9)	−6.5 (20.3)	−6.3 (20.7)	−4.0 (24.8)	0.0 (32.0)	1.6 (34.9)	3.6 (38.5)	−6.7 (19.9)
Average precipitation mm (inches)	17.4 (0.69)	19.7 (0.78)	12.0 (0.47)	20.4 (0.80)	17.6 (0.69)	23.7 (0.93)	18.5 (0.73)	18.6 (0.73)	24.7 (0.97)	24.6 (0.97)	32.7 (1.29)	27.9 (1.10)	258.1 (10.16)
Average precipitation days (≥ 0.2 mm)	3.5	3.0	3.3	5.1	7.3	8.7	9.5	8.3	6.5	6.5	6.3	5.0	73.0
Average afternoon relative humidity (%)	26	29	32	37	45	53	52	41	37	32	28	27	37
Source: Australian Bureau of Meteorology (humidity 1999–2010)

== See also ==
- Protected areas of South Australia
- Taylorville Station (reserve)
- Calperum Station (reserve)
