= Rinzia torquata =

Conservation status
- Priority Three — Poorly Known Taxa (DEC)

Scientific classification
- Kingdom: Plantae
- Clade: Tracheophytes
- Clade: Angiosperms
- Clade: Eudicots
- Clade: Rosids
- Order: Myrtales
- Family: Myrtaceae
- Genus: Rinzia
- Species: R. torquata

Binomial name
- Rinzia torquata Rye & Trudgen

Species of shrub

Rinzia torquata, commonly known as necklace rinzia, is a plant species of the family Myrtaceae endemic to Western Australia.

The shrub is found in the southern Wheatbelt region of Western Australia.
