= Rinzia longifolia =

Conservation status
- Priority Three — Poorly Known Taxa (DEC)

Scientific classification
- Kingdom: Plantae
- Clade: Tracheophytes
- Clade: Angiosperms
- Clade: Eudicots
- Clade: Rosids
- Order: Myrtales
- Family: Myrtaceae
- Genus: Rinzia
- Species: R. longifolia

Binomial name
- Rinzia longifolia Turcz.

Species of flowering plant

Rinzia longifolia, commonly known as the creeping rinzia, is a plant species of the family Myrtaceae endemic to Western Australia.

The prostrate shrub typically grows to a height of 0.1 to 0.4 metres (0.3 to 1.3 ft). It blooms from August to November producing pink-white flowers.

It is found on low rises in the Great Southern region of Western Australia between Cranbrook to Jerramungup where it grows in sandy or clay soils.
