= Rinzia sessilis =

Scientific classification
- Kingdom: Plantae
- Clade: Tracheophytes
- Clade: Angiosperms
- Clade: Eudicots
- Clade: Rosids
- Order: Myrtales
- Family: Myrtaceae
- Genus: Rinzia
- Species: R. sessilis

Binomial name
- Rinzia sessilis Trudgen

Species of shrub

Rinzia sessilis is a plant species of the family Myrtaceae endemic to Western Australia.

The spreading shrub typically grows to a height of 0.25 to 0.8 metres (0.8 to 2.6 ft). It blooms in September producing pink-white flowers.

It is found on undulating flats and low ridges in the southern Wheatbelt and Goldfields-Esperance regions of Western Australia where it grows in sandy-clay or loamy soils with gravel.
