= Rinzia rubra =

Conservation status
- Priority Two — Poorly Known Taxa (DEC)

Scientific classification
- Kingdom: Plantae
- Clade: Tracheophytes
- Clade: Angiosperms
- Clade: Eudicots
- Clade: Rosids
- Order: Myrtales
- Family: Myrtaceae
- Genus: Rinzia
- Species: R. rubra

Binomial name
- Rinzia rubra Trudgen

Species of shrub

Rinzia rubra is a plant species of the family Myrtaceae endemic to Western Australia.

The spreading shrub typically grows to a height of 0.25 to 0.7 metres (0.8 to 2.3 ft) and a width of 1 metre (3 ft). It blooms from August to November producing white flowers.

It is found in a small area on undulating plains in the Goldfields-Esperance region of Western Australia just north of Esperance where it grows in sandy soils.
