= Rinzia communis =

Scientific classification
- Kingdom: Plantae
- Clade: Tracheophytes
- Clade: Angiosperms
- Clade: Eudicots
- Clade: Rosids
- Order: Myrtales
- Family: Myrtaceae
- Genus: Rinzia
- Species: R. communis

Binomial name
- Rinzia communis Trudgen

Species of shrub

Rinzia communis is a plant species of the family Myrtaceae endemic to Western Australia.

The spreading and straggly shrub typically grows to a height of 0.3 metres (1.0 ft). It blooms between July and September producing white-pink flowers.

It is found on hills in the southern Wheatbelt, Great Southern and Goldfields-Esperance regions of Western Australia where it grows in sandy to loamy soils over laterite, granite or limestone.
