= Rinzia fumana =

Scientific classification
- Kingdom: Plantae
- Clade: Tracheophytes
- Clade: Angiosperms
- Clade: Eudicots
- Clade: Rosids
- Order: Myrtales
- Family: Myrtaceae
- Genus: Rinzia
- Species: R. fumana

Binomial name
- Rinzia fumana Schauer

Species of flowering plant

Rinzia fumana, commonly known as the Polished rinzia, is a plant species of the family Myrtaceae endemic to Western Australia.

The prostrate or sprawling shrub typically grows to a height of 0.1 to 0.25 metres (0.3 to 0.8 ft). It blooms from July to October producing pink-white flowers.

It is found in the southern Wheatbelt extending into the Great Southern region of Western Australia where it grows in sandy-loam to clay-loam soils.
