= Rinzia dimorphandra =

Scientific classification
- Kingdom: Plantae
- Clade: Tracheophytes
- Clade: Angiosperms
- Clade: Eudicots
- Clade: Rosids
- Order: Myrtales
- Family: Myrtaceae
- Genus: Rinzia
- Species: R. dimorphandra

Binomial name
- Rinzia dimorphandra (Benth.) Trudgen

Species of flowering plant

Rinzia dimorphandra, commonly known as the Esperance rinzia, is a plant species of the family Myrtaceae endemic to Western Australia.

The rounded shrub typically grows to a height of 0.25 metres (0.8 ft). It blooms in October producing white-pink flowers.

It is found along the south coast in the Goldfields-Esperance region of Western Australia centred around the town of Esperance where it grows in sandy soils.
