= Rinzia affinis =

Conservation status
- Priority Four — Rare Taxa (DEC)

Scientific classification
- Kingdom: Plantae
- Clade: Tracheophytes
- Clade: Angiosperms
- Clade: Eudicots
- Clade: Rosids
- Order: Myrtales
- Family: Myrtaceae
- Genus: Rinzia
- Species: R. affinis

Binomial name
- Rinzia affinis Trudgen

Species of shrub

Rinzia affinis is a plant species of the family Myrtaceae endemic to Western Australia.

The rounded or erect shrub typically grows to a height of 0.2 to 0.7 metres (0.7 to 2.3 ft). It blooms between July and November producing white-pink flowers.

It is found on hills in the southern Wheatbelt and the Great Southern region of Western Australia between Corrigin and Jerramungup where it grows in sandy soils over laterite.
