= Rinzia schollerifolia =

Scientific classification
- Kingdom: Plantae
- Clade: Tracheophytes
- Clade: Angiosperms
- Clade: Eudicots
- Clade: Rosids
- Order: Myrtales
- Family: Myrtaceae
- Genus: Rinzia
- Species: R. schollerifolia

Binomial name
- Rinzia schollerifolia (Lehm.) Trudgen

Species of flowering plant

Rinzia schollerifolia, commonly known as the Cranberry rinzia, is a plant species of the family Myrtaceae endemic to Western Australia.

The spreading to procumbent shrub typically grows to a height of 0.05 to 0.2 metres (0.2 to 0.7 ft) and a width of 0.6 metres (2 ft). It blooms from August to October producing white-pink flowers.

It is found on slopes along the south coast of the Great Southern region of Western Australia centred around Albany where it grows in sandy soils over granite or laterite.

The species was originally formally described as Baeckea scholleraefolia by the botanist Johann Georg Christian Lehmann in 1848 in the work Curae Posteriores in Plantae Preissianae. It was later placed into the genus Rinzia in 1986 by Trudgen in the work Reinstatement and revision of Rinzia Schauer (Myrtaceae, Leptospermeae, Baeckeinae) in the journal Nuytsia. Other synonyms include; Baeckea schollerifolia and Hypocalymma schollerifolium.
