= Rinzia oxycoccoides =

Scientific classification
- Kingdom: Plantae
- Clade: Tracheophytes
- Clade: Angiosperms
- Clade: Eudicots
- Clade: Rosids
- Order: Myrtales
- Family: Myrtaceae
- Genus: Rinzia
- Species: R. oxycoccoides

Binomial name
- Rinzia oxycoccoides Turcz.

Species of flowering plant

Rinzia oxycoccoides, commonly known as the Large flowered rinzia, is a plant species of the family Myrtaceae endemic to Western Australia.

The diffuse, sprawling or procumbent shrub typically grows to a width of 0.6 metres (2.0 ft). It blooms from September to January producing pink-red flowers.

It is found on hillsides in a small area along the south coast where the Great Southern meets the Goldfields-Esperance region of Western Australia centred around the Fitzgerald River National Park where it grows in stony skeletal soils.
