= Rinzia fimbriolata =

Conservation status
- Priority One — Poorly Known Taxa (DEC)

Scientific classification
- Kingdom: Plantae
- Clade: Tracheophytes
- Clade: Angiosperms
- Clade: Eudicots
- Clade: Rosids
- Order: Myrtales
- Family: Myrtaceae
- Genus: Rinzia
- Species: R. fimbriolata

Binomial name
- Rinzia fimbriolata Rye

Species of shrub

Rinzia fimbriolata, commonly known as the Wheatbelt rinzia, is a plant species of the family Myrtaceae endemic to Western Australia.

The shrub is found in a small area of the eastern Wheatbelt region of Western Australia near Yilgarn.
