= Murray-Sunset, Hattah and Annuello Important Bird Area =

Important Bird Area in Victoria, Australia

Coordinates: 34°47′23″S 141°40′13″E

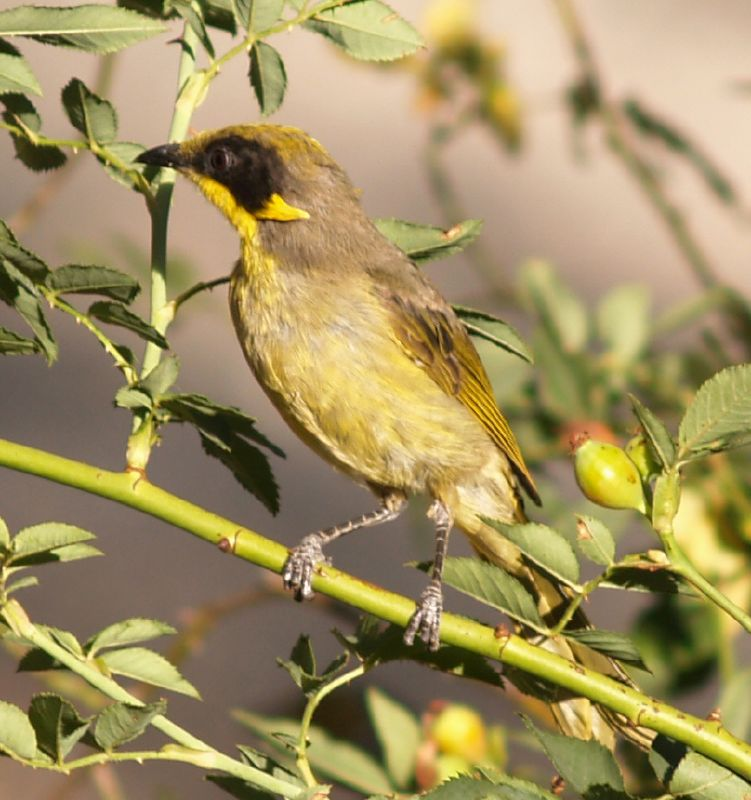
The IBA is an important site for purple-gaped honeyeaters

The Murray-Sunset, Hattah and Annuello Important Bird Area comprises 7004 km^{2} of mallee habitat in the Mallee region of north-western Victoria, Australia.

== Description ==
The IBA encompasses several protected areas with blocks of contiguous uncleared native vegetation. It includes three large area of protected land – most of the Murray-Sunset National Park and the Annuello Nature Conservation Reserve, and the whole of the Hattah-Kulkyne National Park – with some smaller reserves.

== Birds ==
The site has been identified by BirdLife International as an Important Bird Area (IBA) because it supports populations of globally threatened malleefowl, black-eared miners and mallee emu-wren, as well as red-lored whistlers, regent parrots and purple-gaped honeyeaters. In the Hattah lakes it contains ephemeral wetlands which occasionally support large numbers of waterbirds, including hoary-headed grebes, freckled ducks, Pacific black ducks, grey teals, hardheads, pink-eared ducks, black-fronted dotterels and Australian pelicans.

== Threats ==
A management need is to reduce the incidence of large-scale, high intensity, bushfires in the park, allied with ongoing research on fire management strategies for conservation of threatened mallee species.
