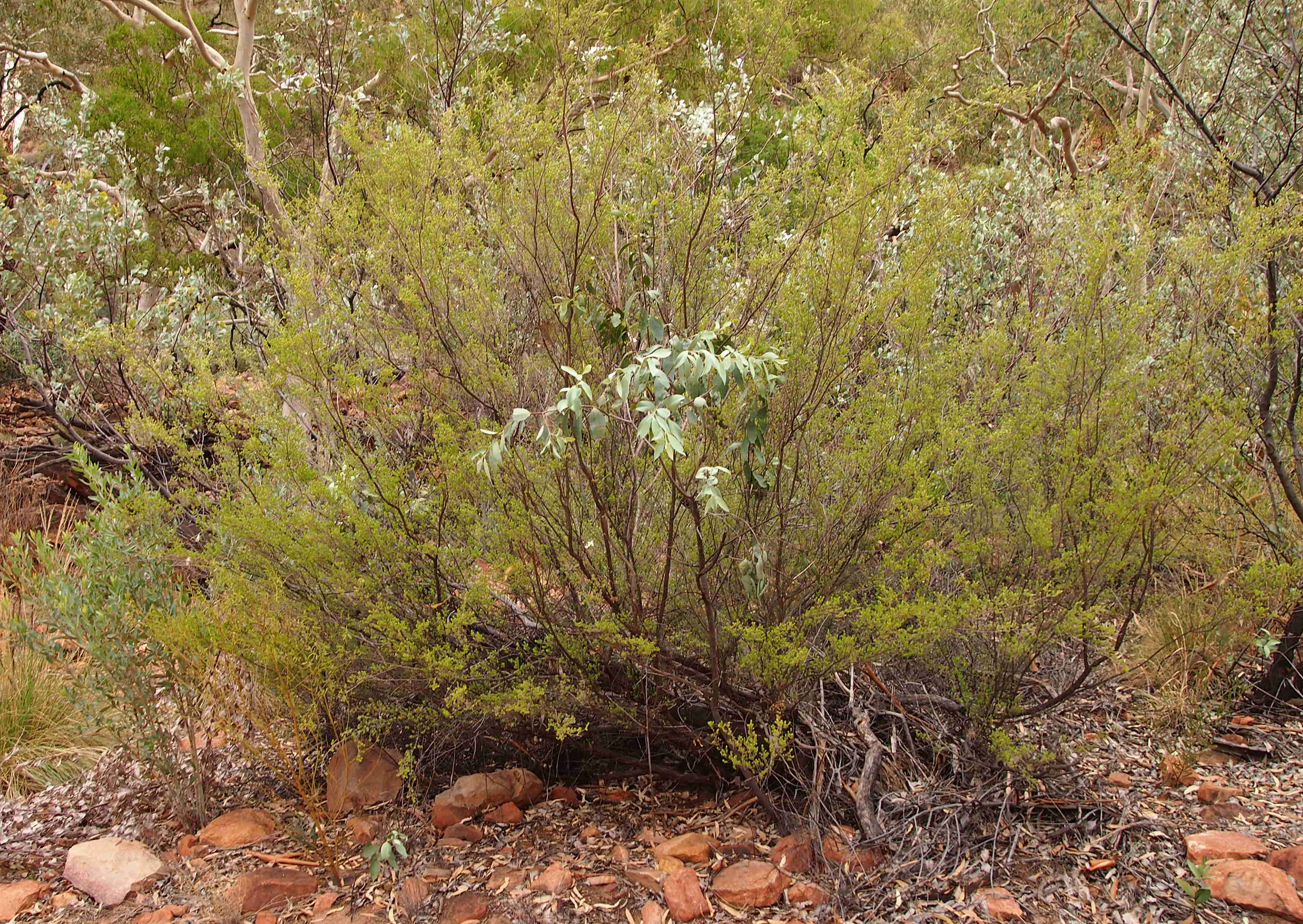

Scientific classification
- Kingdom: Plantae
- Clade: Tracheophytes
- Clade: Angiosperms
- Clade: Eudicots
- Clade: Rosids
- Order: Myrtales
- Family: Myrtaceae
- Genus: Rinzia
- Species: R. polystemona

Binomial name
- Rinzia polystemona (F.Muell.) Rye

= Rinzia polystemona =

Species of shrub

Rinzia polystemona, commonly known as the desert rock myrtle, is a plant species of the family Myrtaceae endemic to Western Australia.

The shrub is found in the far eastern Goldfields-Esperance region of Western Australia near the border with South Australia and the Northern Territory.
