= Rinzia icosandra =

Scientific classification
- Kingdom: Plantae
- Clade: Tracheophytes
- Clade: Angiosperms
- Clade: Eudicots
- Clade: Rosids
- Order: Myrtales
- Family: Myrtaceae
- Genus: Rinzia
- Species: R. icosandra

Binomial name
- Rinzia icosandra (Benth.) Rye

Species of flowering plant

Rinzia icosandra, commonly known as the Recherche mainland rinzia, is a plant species of the family Myrtaceae endemic to Western Australia.

The shrub is found along the south coast of the Goldfields-Esperance region of Western Australia including islands of the Recherche Archipelago.
