= Rinzia carnosa =

Scientific classification
- Kingdom: Plantae
- Clade: Tracheophytes
- Clade: Angiosperms
- Clade: Eudicots
- Clade: Rosids
- Order: Myrtales
- Family: Myrtaceae
- Genus: Rinzia
- Species: R. carnosa

Binomial name
- Rinzia carnosa (S.Moore) Trudgen

Species of flowering plant

Rinzia carnosa, commonly known as the fleshy leaved rinzia, is a plant species of the family Myrtaceae endemic to Western Australia.

The woody sub-shrub typically grows to a height of 0.7 to 1.3 metres (2.3 to 4.3 ft). It has many branches with long slim branchlets. The thick, appressed and pitted leaves have a elliptic to sub-orbicular shape with a length of 0.5 to 2.5 millimetres (0.020 to 0.098 in) and a width of 0.5 to 1 mm (0.020 to 0.039 in). It blooms in September producing white-pink flowers. The flowers are 5 to 7 mm (0.197 to 0.276 in) in diameter with five petals and occur in clusters at the end of the branchlets.

It is found in the south eastern Wheatbelt and the Goldfields-Esperance regions of Western Australia between Corrigin and Jerramungup where it grows in sandy-loamy soils often over granite. The plant is usually part of the understorey in thickets of Acacia shrub communities.

The species was originally formally described as Baeckea carnosa by the botanist S.Moore in 1920 in the work A contribution to the Flora of Australia. in the Journal of the Linnean Society. It was subsequently reclassified into the genus Rinzia in 1986 as part of the work Reinstatement and revision of Rinzia Schauer (Myrtaceae, Leptospermeae, Baeckeinae) in the journal Nuytsia.
