= Calperum Station (reserve) =

Protected area in South Australia

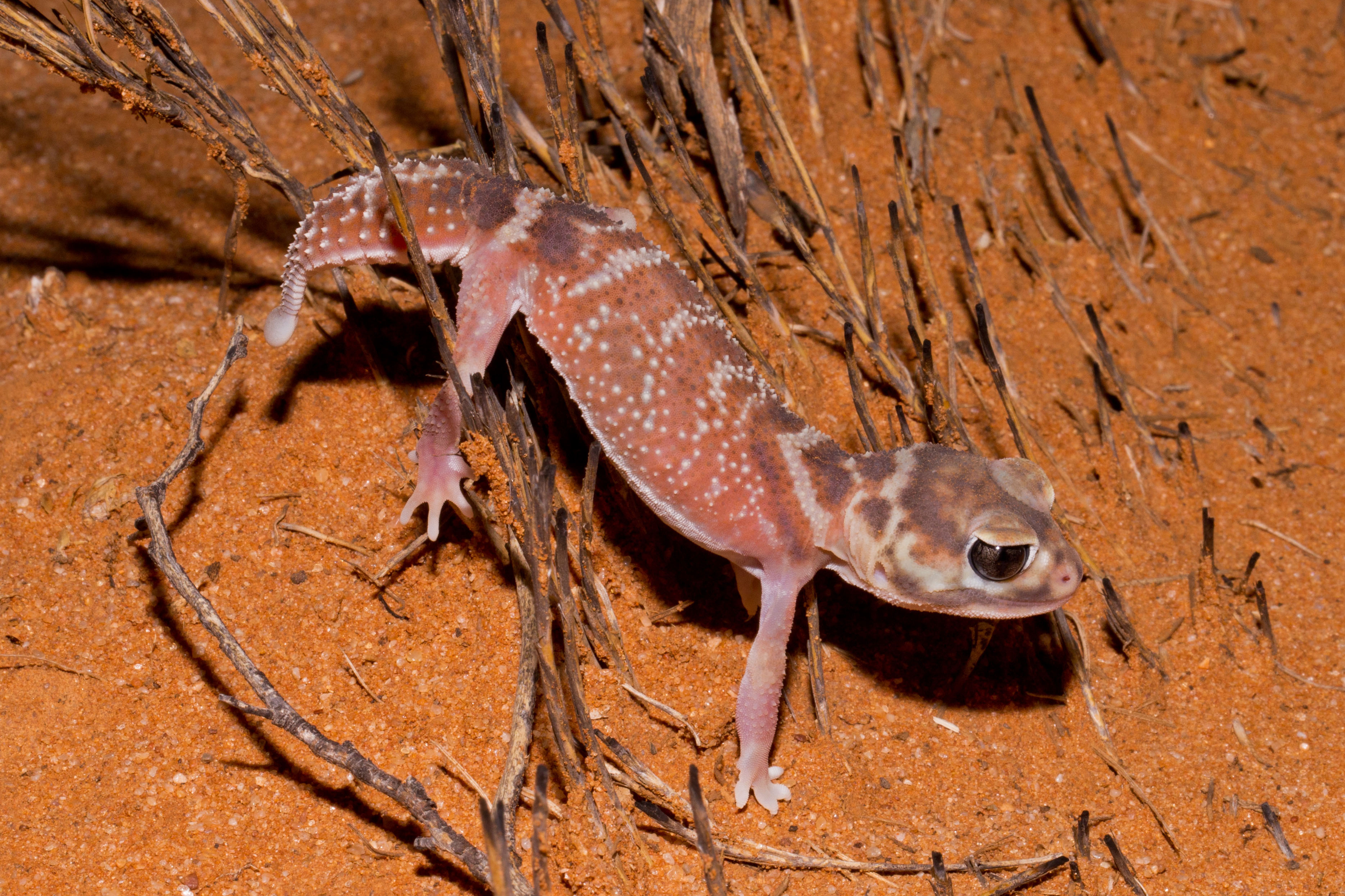
- Nephrurus levis from Calperum Reserve

- Location within South Australia
- Location: South Australia, Calperum Station
- Nearest city: Renmark
- Coordinates: 33°49′0″S 140°34′0″E
- Area: 2,386 km^{2} (921 sq mi)
- Established: 1993
- Governing body: Austland Services Pty Ltd on behalf of the Director of National Parks
- Website: http://www.environment.gov.au/node/20941

Calperum Station, also known as Calperum Reserve, is a nature reserve located in the east of the Australian state of South Australia about 10 kilometres (6.2 miles) north-west of the town of Renmark and about 250 kilometres (160 miles) east of the state capital of Adelaide. Calperum Station consists of three separate pastoral leases - Calperum, Calperum Road and Yubalia.

The property is a de-stocked pastoral (sheep) station managed by the Australian Landscape Trust. It is managed for public benefit as a site for habitat and species conservation, scientific research and public education. Most of the property is listed as "critical habitat" for a threatened species of bird, the black-eared miner, but it is not an officially-designated protected area.

The reserve includes a major part of the Riverland Ramsar site, a wetland of international significance, and Calperum Station is also part of a larger reserve system known as the Riverland Biosphere Reserve. It also includes a major part of the Riverland Ramsar Site. Calperum Station is part of a larger reserve system known as the Riverland Biosphere Reserve.

== History ==
The Calperum homestead is located on a site formerly known as Ral Ral. Ral Ral was named after the Aboriginal king of the area. During the early years of European settlement of South Australia, from around 1838 drovers used Ral Ral as a campsite and place to water their livestock (at Ral Ral Creek) as they were being driven down into South Australia. From around 1846 European men were given annual licences to occupy the area and graze their sheep and cattle, until 14 pastoral leases were issued in 1851. One of these was a property which became known as Chowilla and then Chowilla-Bookmark, before being split into two in 1896 – Chowilla and Calperum.

John Holland Robertson held the Calperum lease from 1896 until he died in 1909, after which it remained in the family until 1953, and it changed hands a few times, during which time it was split among three brothers, before the lease was sold to the federal government in 1993.

Calperum Station consists of three separate pastoral leases - Calperum, Calperum Road and Yubalia. These were purchased in 1993 by the Chicago Zoological Society, using funds obtained both from the McCormick Foundation (Note: Possibly Edith Rockefeller McCormick.) and the Australian Government. The leases were subsequently transferred by deed of assignment to the Director of National Parks to hold in trust.

Since 2003, the reserve is managed along with the Taylorville Station reserve under contract by the Australian Landscape Trust Association Inc. (ALT). During the financial year 2013–14, the pastoral leases along with those for the Taylorville Station reserve were transferred to Austland Services Pty Ltd, a company owned by ALT, which "will continue to manage the properties in accordance with the trust arrangements".

== Description ==
=== Location, size and vegetation ===
The reserve is located on the north side of the Murray River, bounded to its western side by the Taylorville Station reserve and the Gluepot Reserve. The reserve covers an area of 2,386 square kilometres (921 square miles) and was described in 2008 as follows:

Some 95% of Calperum Station is covered by Mallee vegetation communities growing on the east-west red brown dunes of the Loxton-Parilla Sands. The remaining 5% is occupied by the Murray River floodplain which includes 4 wetlands: Merreti; Woolpolool; Clover; and Woolpolool Swamp, which are part of the 30,600 hectare ‘Riverland’ Ramsar site.

The Riverland Ramsar site was declared a wetland of international significance under the Ramsar Convention.

=== Purpose ===
The purpose of the reserve is the protection of "Listed Critical Habitat" for the black-eared miner bird species, in conjunction with both the Taylorville Station reserve and the Gluepot Reserve. The reserve, along with Taylorville Station, is also reported as being "important for the conservation of the nationally vulnerable malleefowl (Leipoa ocellata), the regionally vulnerable bush stone-curlew (Burhinus grallarius) and the nationally vulnerable southern bell frog (Litoria ramiformis)". The reserve is one of the "key components of the Riverland (formerly Bookmark) Biosphere Reserve". Calperum Station is sometimes referred to as Calperum Reserve.

In 2011, the Calperum Mallee SuperSite was established at the reserve. This is part of Australian Flux Network Project, which monitors ecosystems and land restoration projects, and is run by a partnership between the University of Adelaide and Australian Landscape Trust.

== Status ==
Calperum Station has not been classified as an IUCN protected area as of 2021. It was reported in 2012 that the reserve is being "managed for a broader, additional set of objectives, including environmentally sustainable development such as tourism".

== Management ==
As of 2014, the reserve and the Taylorville Station reserve were managed as one unit by Austland Services Pty Ltd. The management agreement with the Director of National Parks requires that the reserve be used as "a model for the implementation of the UNESCO Biosphere Reserve Action Plan".

In December 2020, the Commonwealth Environmental Water Office (CEWO) and the Australian Landscape Trust entered into a five-year partnership to deliver water for the environment to continue improving the health of the Calperum floodplain. It is planned that 11,000 megalitres (390×10^{6} cu ft) of water for the environment would be delivered to the Riverland Ramsar site over the following five years, to help provide habitat for the native wildlife. There had been some water delivered previously, in particular during the 2018–2019 drought, with the assistance of the Riverland Indigenous rangers.

== Archaeological finds ==
Because Calperum Station lies on a floodplain, it is likely that Aboriginal Australian peoples have been able to access large amounts of resources in the area for a long time, but the archaeology of the area had not been investigated in detail before 2014. As of 2021, archaeologists from Flinders University in South Australia and Griffith University in Queensland have been working in partnership with the River Murray and Mallee and Ngarrindjeri Aboriginal Corporations exploring the Riverland area. They found Aboriginal artefacts, including two perforated shells dated to around 600 years ago, and a shell with a serrated edge, dating from around 6,000 years ago, at Calperum Station and Murrawong (near Murray Bridge). Uses for the rare artefacts are still under investigation, but both functional and aesthetic uses are likely.

== See also ==
- Protected areas of Australia
