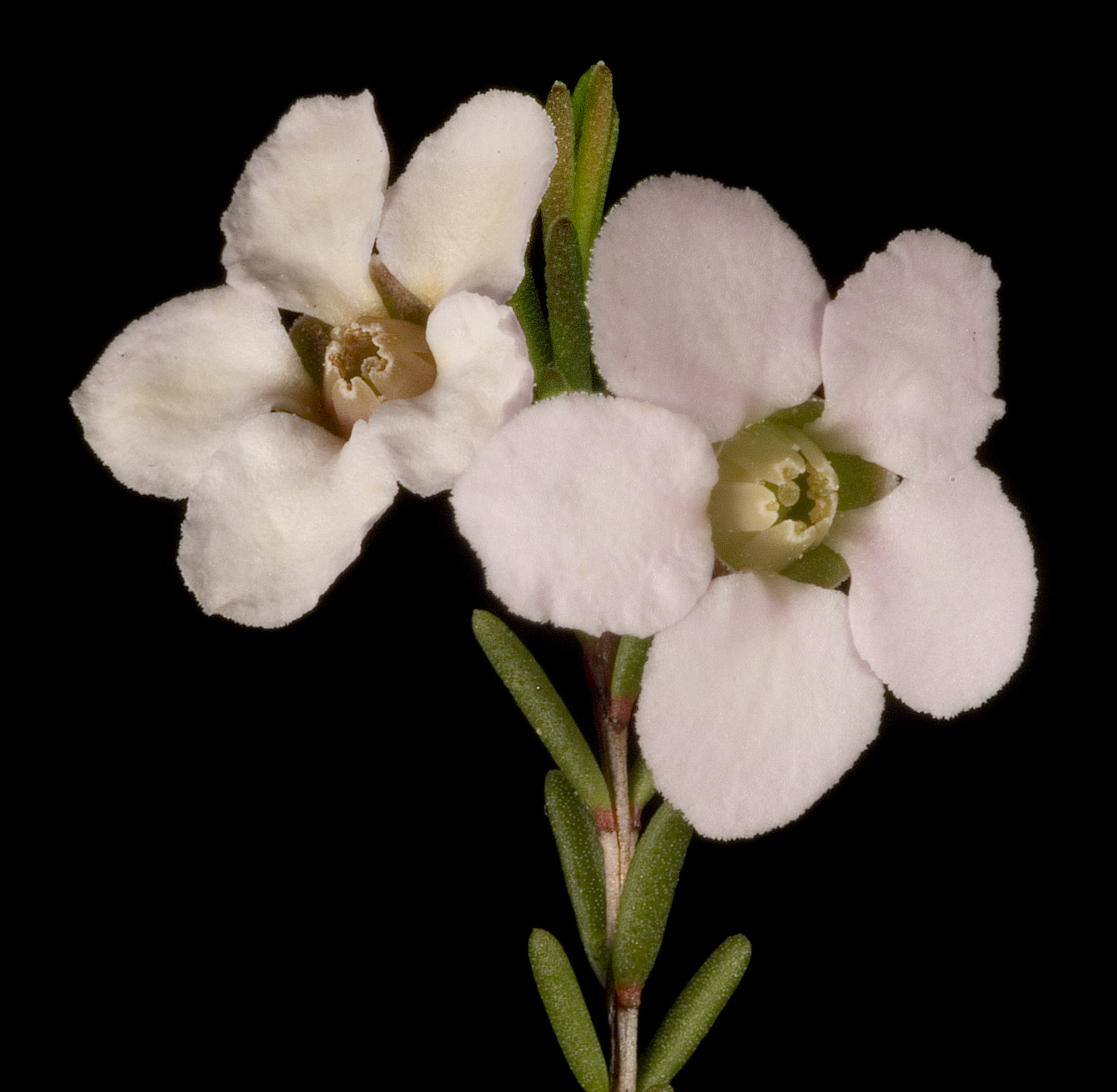

Scientific classification
- Kingdom: Plantae
- Clade: Tracheophytes
- Clade: Angiosperms
- Clade: Eudicots
- Clade: Rosids
- Order: Myrtales
- Family: Myrtaceae
- Subfamily: Myrtoideae
- Tribe: Chamelaucieae
- Genus: Rinzia; Schauer

Synonyms
- Baeckea sect. Rinzia (Schauer) Benth. & Hook.f.

= Rinzia =

Genus of flowering plants

Rinzia is a genus of flowering plants in the family Myrtaceae. The genus was first formally described in 1843 and reinstated and revised in 1986.

== Species list ==
The following names are accepted by Plants of the World Online as at January 2022:

- Rinzia affinis Trudgen
- Rinzia carnosa (S.Moore) Trudgen
- Rinzia communis Trudgen
- Rinzia crassifolia Turcz.
- Rinzia dimorphandra (F.Muell. ex Benth.) Trudgen
- Rinzia ericaea (F.Muell.) Rye
  - Rinzia ericaea (F.Muell.) Ryesubsp. ericaea Rye & Trudgen
  - Rinzia ericaea subsp. insularis Rye
- Rinzia fimbriolata Rye
- Rinzia fumana Schauer
- Rinzia icosandra (F.Muell. ex Benth.) Rye
- Rinzia longifolia Turcz.
- Rinzia medifila Rye & Trudgen
- Rinzia orientalis Rye
- Rinzia oxycoccoides Turcz.
- Rinzia polystemonea (F.Muell.) Rye
- Rinzia rubra Trudgen
- Rinzia schollerifolia (Lehm.) Trudgen
- Rinzia sessilis Trudgen
- Rinzia torquata Rye & Trudgen
- Rinzia triplex Rye & Trudgen
