= Rinzia triplex =

Conservation status
- Priority Three — Poorly Known Taxa (DEC)

Scientific classification
- Kingdom: Plantae
- Clade: Tracheophytes
- Clade: Angiosperms
- Clade: Eudicots
- Clade: Rosids
- Order: Myrtales
- Family: Myrtaceae
- Genus: Rinzia
- Species: R. triplex

Binomial name
- Rinzia triplex Rye & Trudgen

Species of shrub

Rinzia triplex, commonly known as triad rinzia, is a plant species of the family Myrtaceae endemic to Western Australia.

The shrub is found in the southern Goldfields-Esperance region of Western Australia between Coolgardie, Menzies and Yilgarn.
