= Taylorville Station (reserve) =

Protected area in South Australia

- IUCN category IV (habitat/species management area)
- Location within South Australia
- Location: South Australia
- Nearest city: Renmark
- Coordinates: 33°56′0″S 140°11′0″E
- Area: 92.6 km^{2} (35.8 sq mi)
- Established: 14 March 2005
- Visitors: 2700 (shared with Calperum Station) (in 2010-11)
- Governing body: Austland Services Pty Ltd on behalf of the Director of National Parks
- Website: Official website

Taylorville Station is a protected area located in the east of the Australian state of South Australia about 35 kilometres (22 miles) north west of the town of Renmark and about 250 kilometres (160 miles) east of the state capital of Adelaide. It is a protected area which is under the control of the Australian government rather than the Government of South Australia and which is managed by a private organisation under contract. Taylorville Station is part of an area whose habitat has been listed as "critical" for the survival of the bird species, black-eared miner. It is also part of a larger reserve system known as the Riverland Biosphere Reserve.

== Nomenclature ==
Taylorville Station as a protected area is referred in various sources either as "Taylorville Station" or as a "reserve".

== Description ==
=== Location, size and vegetation ===
The reserve is located in the east of South Australia on the north side of the Murray River about 35 kilometres (22 miles) to the north-west of the town of Renmark and about 250 kilometres (160 miles) east of the Adelaide city centre. It is bounded to its eastern side by the Calperum Station reserve and to its north by the Gluepot Reserve. The reserve covers an area of 92.6 square kilometres (35.8 square miles) and is "entirely vegetated by Mallee vegetation communities".

=== Purpose ===
The purpose of the reserve is the protection of "Listed Critical Habitat" for the bird species, black-eared miner, in conjunction with both the Calperum Station reserve and the Gluepot Reserve. The reserve along with the Calperum Station reserve is reported as being "important for the conservation of the nationally vulnerable malleefowl (Leipoa ocellata), the regionally vulnerable bush stone-curlew (Burhinus grallarius) and the nationally vulnerable southern bell frog (Litoria ramiformis)". The reserve is also reported as being one of the "key components of the Riverland (formerly Bookmark) Biosphere Reserve".

== History ==
The pastoral leases for the land were purchased in 2000 by Australian Landscape Trust Association Incorporated (ALT) using funds obtained both from its own sources and those granted by the Australian Government. The leases were subsequently transferred by deed of assignment to the Director of National Parks to hold in trust with ALT and the Director of National Parks entering into an agreement for ALT to manage the land. During the financial year 2013-14, the pastoral leases along with those for the Calperum Station reserve were transferred to Austland Services Pty Ltd which is a company owned by ALT and who "will continue to manage the properties in accordance with the trust arrangements".

== Management ==
As of 2014, the reserve and the Calperum Station reserve was managed as one unit by Austland Services Pty Ltd. The management agreement with the Director of National Parks includes at least three principal requirements. Firstly, Taylorville Station (i.e. the pastoral lease) is to be used for "conservation and protection of mallee and other vegetation associations on the land, along with their dependent wildlife". Secondly, the reserve is to be used for "public education as a model for the implementation of the UNESCO Man and the Biosphere Programme directed to the maintenance of regional biodiversity". Thirdly, the reserve is to be managed as a Category IV protected area consistent with the requirements of the regulations to the Environment Protection and Biodiversity Conservation Act 1999.

== Protected area status ==
The reserve is reported as being declared as a protected area on 14 March 2005 and as of 2014, it is classified as an IUCN Category IV reserve.

== See also ==
- Protected areas of Australia

== Citations and references ==
=== References ===
- "Listed Critical Habitat - Manorina melanotis (Black-eared Miner) - Gluepot Reserve, Taylorville Station and Calperum Station, excluding the area of Calperum Station south and east of Main Wentworth Road". Australian Government, Department for the Environment (DoE). 2004.
- "Fire Management Plan, Bookmark Mallee 2009-2019" (PDF). Department for Environment and Heritage. 2009. Archived from the original (PDF) on 28 September 2015.
- "State of the Parks Report Annual Report 2011-12 Supplementary Information" (PDF). Australian Government, Director of National Parks (DNP). 2012.
- "State of the Parks Report, Director of National Parks Annual Report 2013–14". Australian Government, Director of National Parks (DNP). 2014.
- "Danggali Wilderness Protection Area and Conservation Park Management Plan 2011" (PDF). Department of Environment and Natural Resources (DEWNR). 2011.
- "Review of Land Management Services delivered under contractual arrangements between Director of National Parks and Austland Services Pty Ltd" (PDF). Brian Gilligan. 2008.
