= Rinzia crassifolia =

Scientific classification
- Kingdom: Plantae
- Clade: Tracheophytes
- Clade: Angiosperms
- Clade: Eudicots
- Clade: Rosids
- Order: Myrtales
- Family: Myrtaceae
- Genus: Rinzia
- Species: R. crassifolia

Binomial name
- Rinzia crassifolia Turcz.

Species of flowering plant

Rinzia crassifolia, commonly known as the Darling Range rinzia, is a plant species of the family Myrtaceae endemic to Western Australia.

The prostrate or spreading to erect shrub typically grows to a height of 0.2 metres (0.7 ft) and a width of 0.4 m (1.3 ft). It blooms between August and September producing white-pink flowers.

It is found on rises and among rocky outcrops in the western Wheatbelt and the Swan Coastal Plain regions of Western Australia where it grows in sandy or clay soils over laterite.
