= Crinum rautanenianum =

Scientific classification
- Kingdom: Plantae
- Clade: Tracheophytes
- Clade: Angiosperms
- Clade: Monocots
- Order: Asparagales
- Family: Amaryllidaceae
- Subfamily: Amaryllidoideae
- Genus: Crinum
- Species: C. rautanenianum

Binomial name
- Crinum rautanenianum Schinz

Species of flowering plant

Crinum rautanenianum is a species of flowering plant in the family Amaryllidaceae, native to Zambia, Botswana and the Caprivi Strip.
