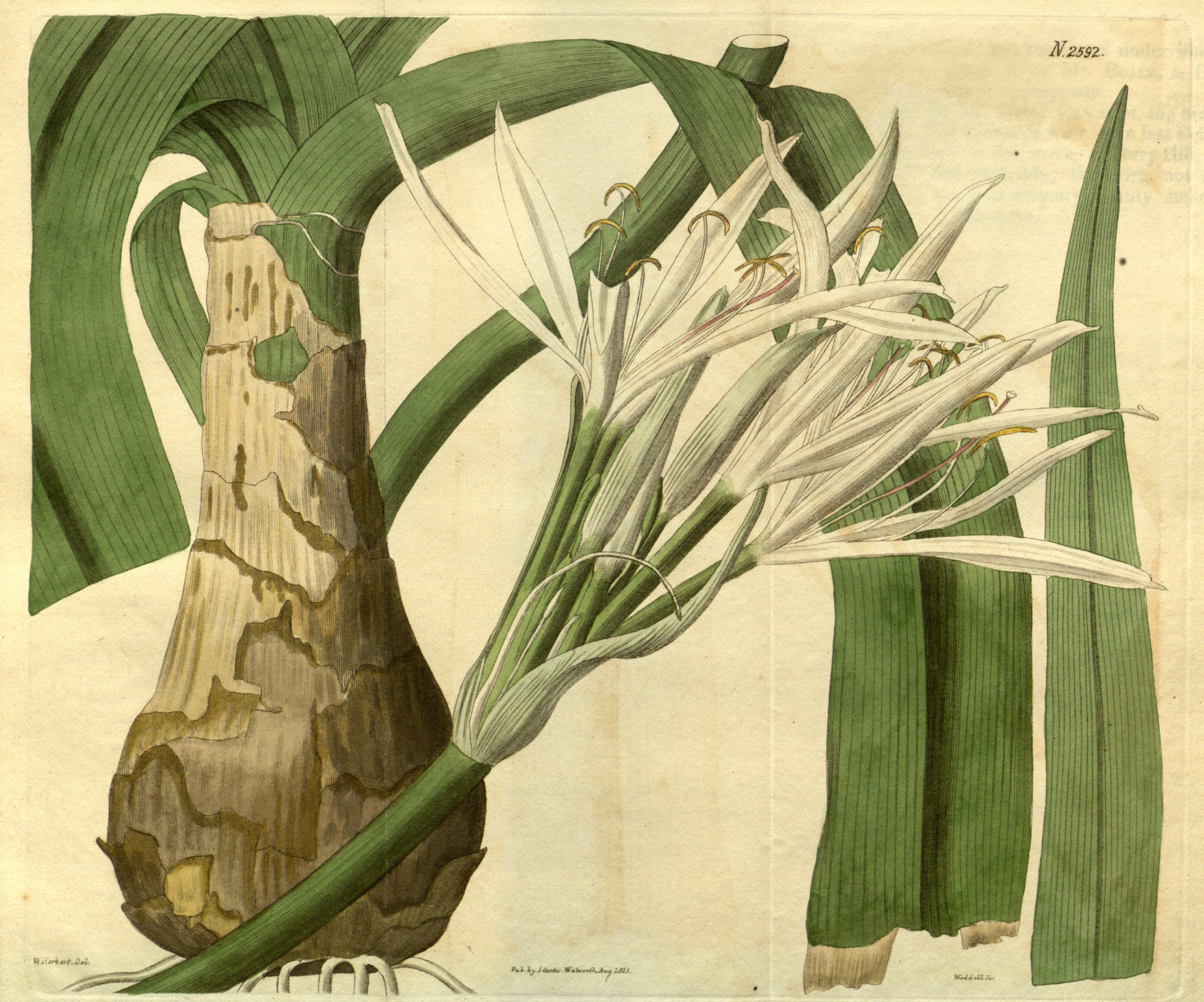
- Crinum lorifolium as Crinum elegans Illustration in Curtis's Botanical Magazine, vol. 52, t. 2592, 1825

Scientific classification
- Kingdom: Plantae
- Clade: Tracheophytes
- Clade: Angiosperms
- Clade: Monocots
- Order: Asparagales
- Family: Amaryllidaceae
- Subfamily: Amaryllidoideae
- Genus: Crinum
- Species: C. lorifolium

Binomial name
- Crinum lorifolium (L.) Thunb.

Synonyms
- Crinum lorifolium Roxb. ex Ker Gawl.; Crinum longifolium Roxb. ex Ker Gawl.; Crinum pratense Herb.; Crinum elegans Carey ex Herb.; Crinum canalifolium Herb.

= Crinum lorifolium =

Species of flowering plant

Crinum lorifolium is a species of flowering plants in the family Amaryllidaceae. It is found in India and Myanmar.

== Taxonomy ==
=== Synonyms ===
- Homotypic
  - Crinum pratense Herb.
  - Crinum pratense var. lorifolium (Roxb.) Herb.
- Heterotypic
  - Crinum longifolium Roxb. ex Ker Gawl.
  - Crinum canalifolium Carey ex Herb.
  - Crinum elegans Carey ex Herb.
  - Crinum venustum Carey ex Herb.
  - Crinum pratense var. canalifolium (Carey ex Herb.) Herb.
  - Crinum pratense var. elegans (Carey ex Herb.) Herb.
  - Crinum pratense var. longifolium Herb.
  - Crinum pratense var. venustum (Carey ex Herb.) Herb.
