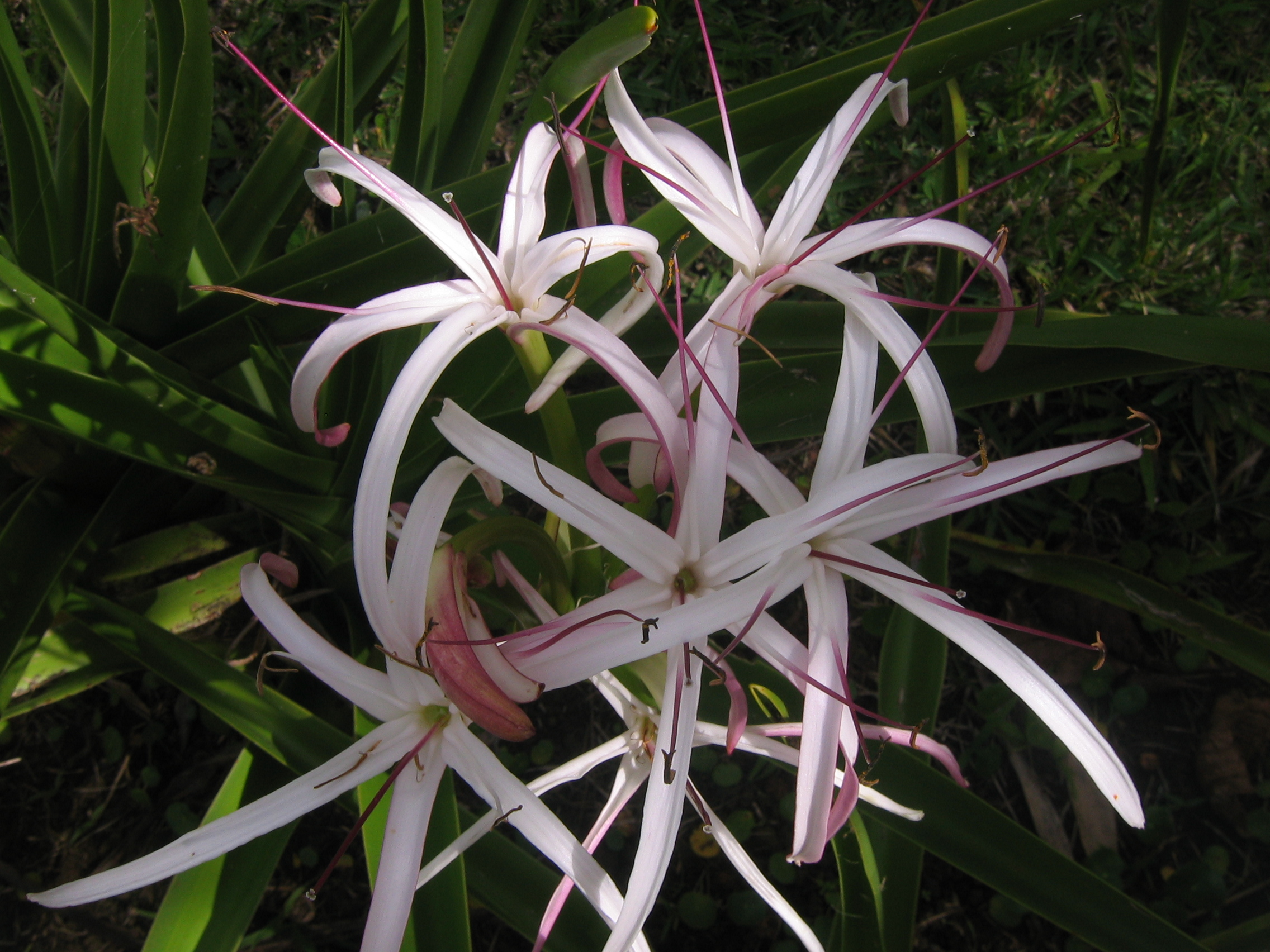
- Detail of flowers and foliage

Scientific classification
- Kingdom: Plantae
- Clade: Tracheophytes
- Clade: Angiosperms
- Clade: Monocots
- Order: Asparagales
- Family: Amaryllidaceae
- Subfamily: Amaryllidoideae
- Genus: Crinum
- Species: C. mauritianum

Binomial name
- Crinum mauritianum G.Lodd.

= Crinum mauritianum =

Species of flowering plant

Crinum mauritianum ("Mauritius Swamp-lily" or "Lys du Pays") is a herbaceous plant belonging to the family Amaryllidaceae, and endemic to Mauritius.

== Description ==
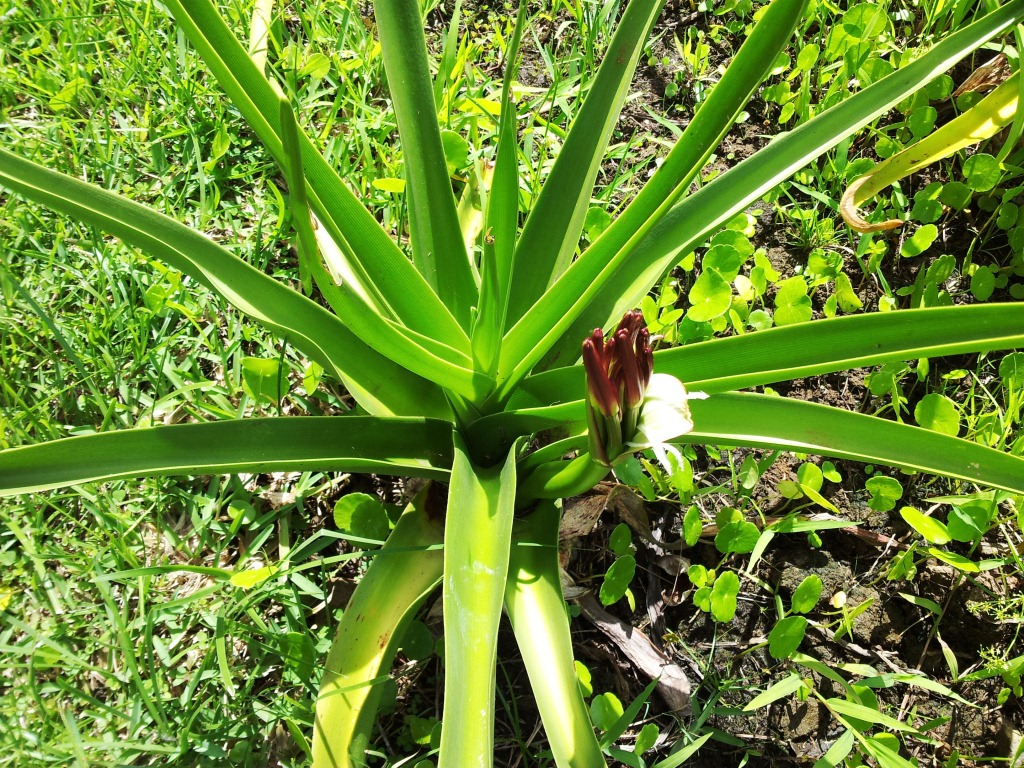
Rosette of Crinum mauritianum, showing the narrow, grooved, light green leaves.

Crinum mauritianum has long, narrow, stiff (slightly succulent) leaves, that are initially held erect and often curve upwards. The leaves are light green, and strongly canaliculate (grooved) on the upper, adaxial side.

== Distribution and rediscovery ==
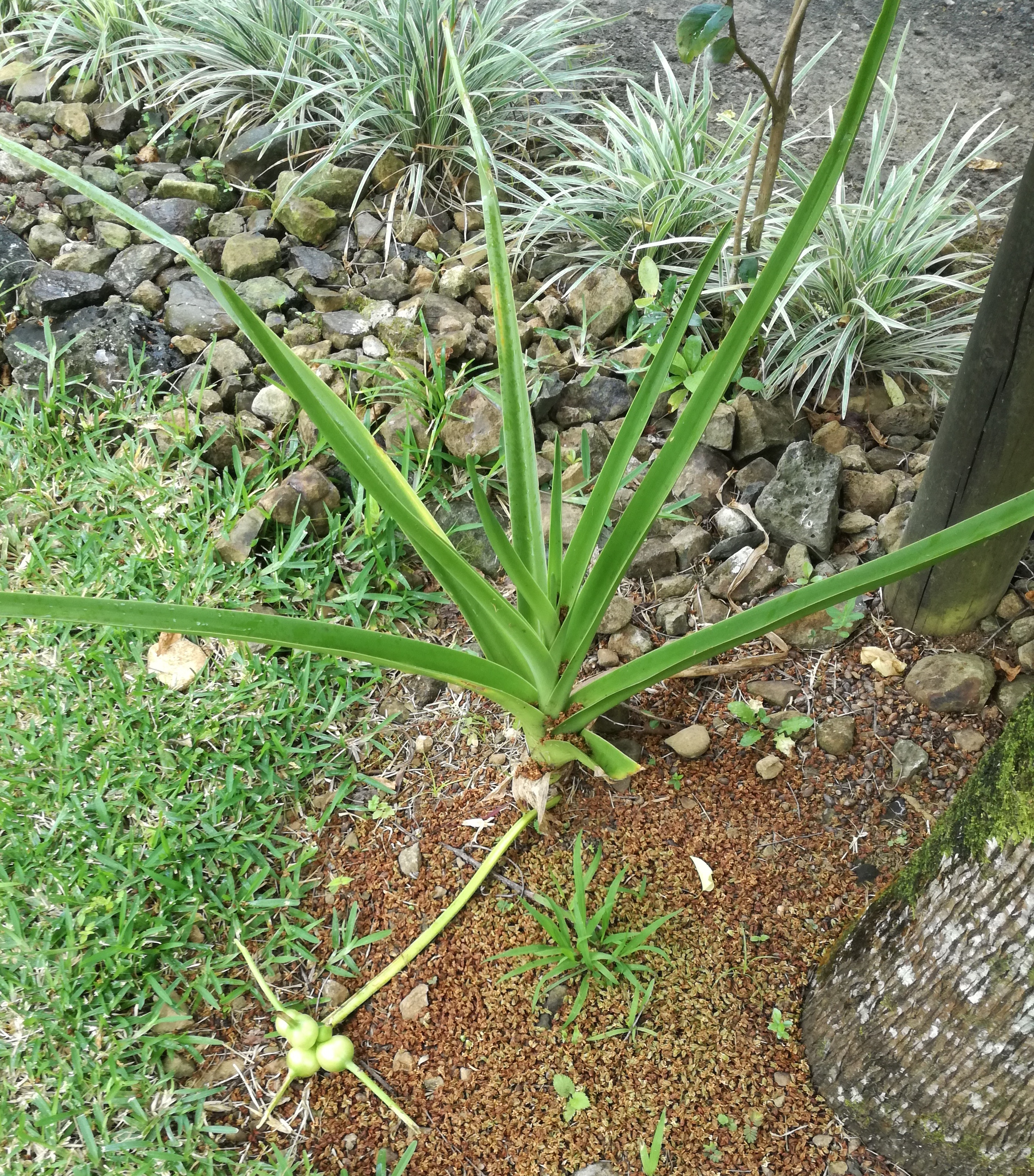
Crinum mauritianum specimen in cultivation, showing the semi-ripe fruits.

Formerly widespread across the wetter areas of Mauritius, it was believed to be extinct, but was rediscovered in 1973, near Midlands Dam (Barrage de Midlands).

It has become an ornamental in Mauritius, frequently used in landscaping, due to its white flowers and partially succulent, upwards curving leaves.

It can therefore easily be confused with the non-native species Crinum asiaticum, which is also used for public landscaping in Mauritius. However, that species has broader, strap-shaped leaves. The narrow, stiffer, often upturned leaves of C.mauritianum are relatively unique and can be used to distinguish it from the introduced species of Crinum.

== Medicinal uses ==
The species was long used in traditional medicine by Mauritians, specifically for treating rheumatism and inflammation. It is therefore currently being investigated for medicinal benefits.
