= Black-eared miner =

Conservation status
- Endangered (IUCN 3.1)

Scientific classification
- Kingdom: Animalia
- Phylum: Chordata
- Class: Aves
- Order: Passeriformes
- Family: Meliphagidae
- Genus: Manorina
- Species: M. melanotis

Binomial name
- Manorina melanotis (Wilson, FE, 1911)
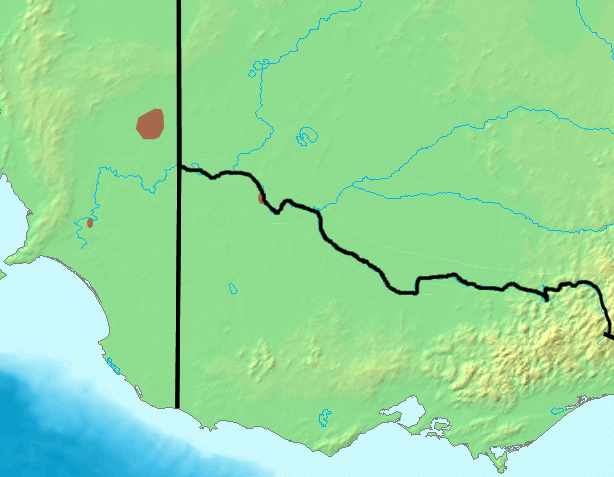
- Distribution of the black-eared miner

Species of bird

The black-eared miner (Manorina melanotis) is an endangered honeyeater endemic to mallee woodland in south-eastern Australia.

== Taxonomy ==
Manorina melanotis was identified by Francis Erasmus Wilson in 1911. It is closely related to the much more widely distributed yellow-throated miner M. flavigula, and the taxonomic status of the black-eared miner is the subject of some controversy, with some researchers considering it a subspecies of M. flavigula.

== Behaviour ==
Black-eared miners are co-operative breeders, living in colonies during the breeding season, and dispersing into the bush during non-breeding periods. Little is known of their movements during these periods.

In 2022, it was reported that the species had been interbreeding with the yellow-throated miner.

== Distribution and habitat ==
IBA (Important Bird and Biodiversity Areas), identified by BirdLife International as being important for black-eared miner conservation, are areas containing relatively intact, mallee woodland in north-western Victoria and south-eastern South Australia. They comprise Murray-Sunset, Hattah and Annuello, the Riverland Mallee, and Wyperfeld, Big Desert and Ngarkat.

== Conservation status ==
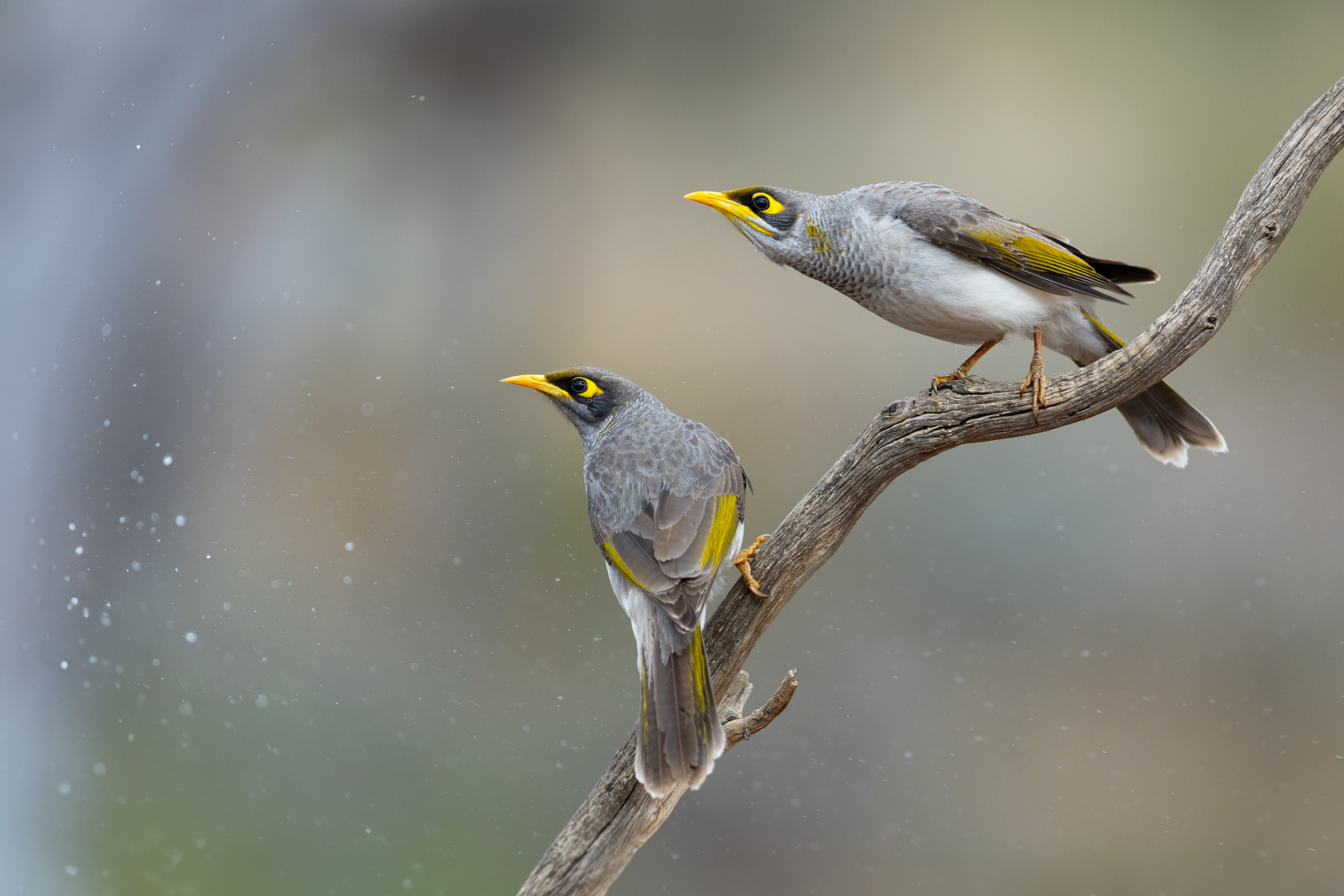
Yellow-throated miner (right) and black-eared miner × yellow-throated miner hybrid (left). Recent contact of black-earned miner and yellow-throated miner populations is due to human impacts on mallee habitat

Black-eared miners' survival became threatened by habitat clearance to make way for agriculture, and the bird experienced competition from feral goats, European rabbits, kangaroos, and other large herbivores, which then had access to water which they had not previously had. The species was assessed as "probably Australia's rarest and most endangered bird" in 2016 by ornithologist John McLaughlin, while a 2018 study ranked it as the 10th bird at most risk of extinction.

As of 2022, there remain around 200 colonies, with up to 20 birds within each colony. Interbreeding with the yellow-throated miner has affected the genetic integrity of the black-eared miner, which adds to the risk to their population.

The species is listed as endangered on the IUCN Red List (2021.3) and under the Australian Environment Protection and Biodiversity Conservation Act 1999, and its conservation status in several Australian states is as follows:

- New South Wales: Listed as "Critically Endangered" by the Biodiversity Conservation Act 2016 (NSW), as of February 2022.
- South Australia: Listed as "Endangered" by the National Parks and Wildlife Act 1972, as of January 2020.
- Victoria: Listed as "Threatened" by the Flora and Fauna Guarantee Act (1988), as of October 2021, and as "endangered" on the 2007 advisory list of threatened vertebrate fauna. Under this Act, an Action Statement for the recovery and future management of this species has been prepared.

=== Conservation measures ===
In July 2022, it was announced that AUD$125,000 has been dedicated to protect the black-eared miner. The Australian Government has provided the funding to the Murraylands and Riverland Landscape Board (MRLB) and their partners for the project. As part of the project, researchers will do genetic testing of birds in the 200 populations.

== See also ==
- Calperum Station (reserve)
- Gluepot Reserve
- Taylorville Station (reserve)
