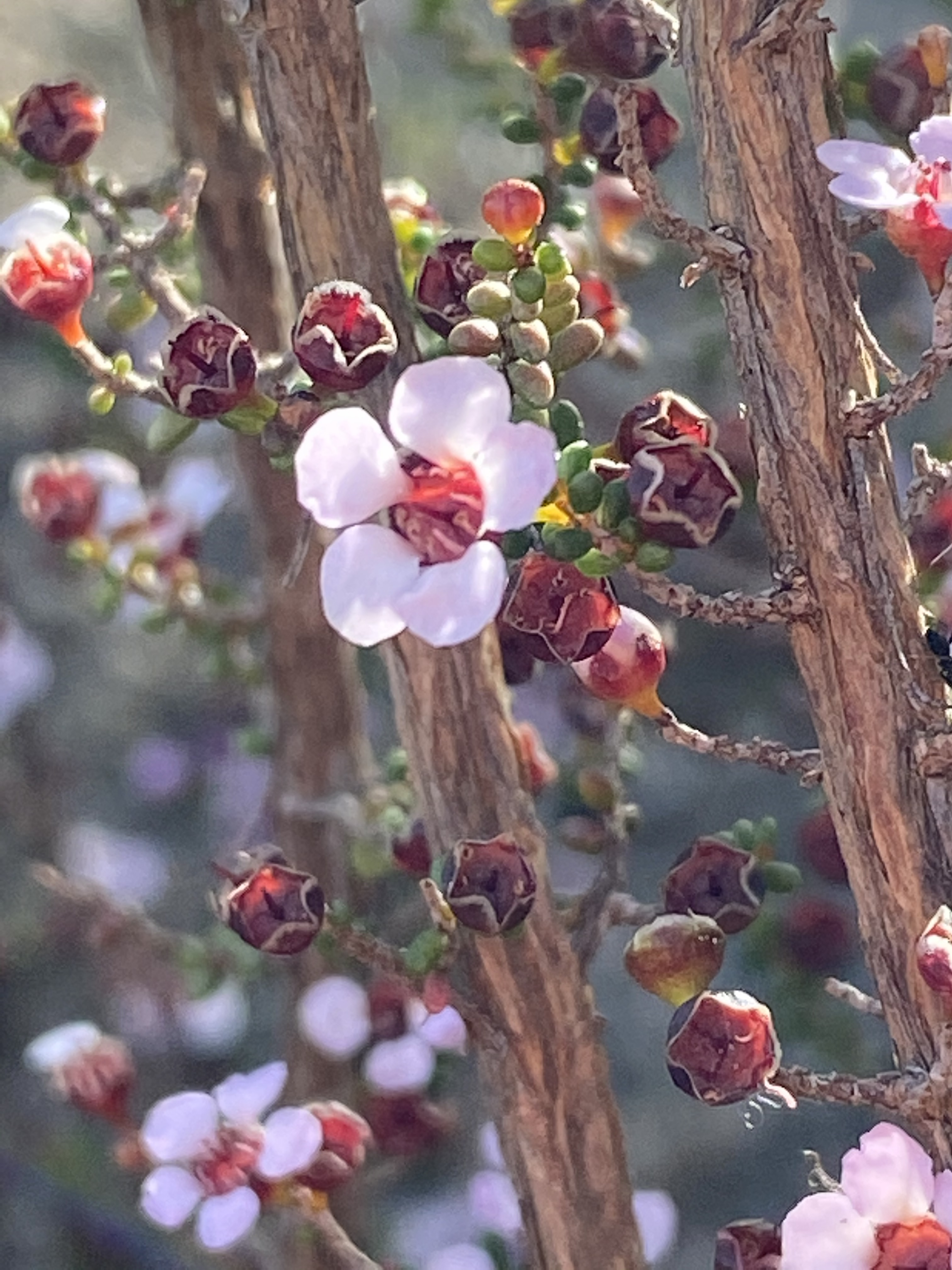

Scientific classification
- Kingdom: Plantae
- Clade: Tracheophytes
- Clade: Angiosperms
- Clade: Eudicots
- Clade: Rosids
- Order: Myrtales
- Family: Myrtaceae
- Genus: Rinzia
- Species: R. orientalis

Binomial name
- Rinzia orientalis Rye

Synonyms
- Baeckea crassifolia Lindl.; Baeckea crassifolia var. pentamera J.M.Black

= Rinzia orientalis =

Species of plant

Rinzia orientalis, commonly known as desert heath-myrtle, is a species of flowering plant in the family Myrtaceae and is endemic to south-eastern Australia. It is a shrub with elliptic to narrowly oblong leaves and white or pale pink flowers usually with ten stamens.

== Description ==
Rinzia orientalis is a shrub that typically grows to a height of 20–75 cm (7.9–29.5 in) and is usually single-stemmed at the base. The leaves are elliptic to narrowly oblong, 1.4–5 mm (0.055–0.197 in) long, 0.5–0.7 mm (0.020–0.028 in) long and 04–0.6 mm (0.157–0.024 in) thick on a petiole 0.2–0.3 mm (0.0079–0.0118 in) long. The flowers are arranged singly in leaf axils and are 5–8 mm (0.20–0.31 in) wide, borne on a pedicel 0.8–1.5 mm (0.031–0.059 in) long with bracteoles 1.0–1.5 mm (0.039–0.059 in) long but that fall off as the flower opens. The five sepals are dark red with a white edge, 0.8–1.3 mm (0.031–0.051 in) long and the five petals are white or pale pink and 2.2–3.1 mm (0.087–0.122 in) long. There are usually ten stamens and the style is 0.8–2.2 mm (0.031–0.087 in) long. Flowering mainly occurs from August to November and the fruit is 2.0–2.5 mm (0.079–0.098 in) in diameter containing kidney-shaped seeds.

== Taxonomy ==
The species was first formally described in 1838 by John Lindley who gave it the name Baeckea crassifolia in Thomas Mitchell's book Three Expeditions into the interior of Eastern Australia. In 2017, Barbara Lynette Rye changed the name to Rinzia orientalis in the journal Nuytsia. (The name Rinzia crassifolia was not available, because it had already been applied by Nikolai Turczaninow to a different taxon.) The specific epithet (orientalis) means "pertaining to the east" referring to the species' distribution compared to other members of the genus.

== Distribution and habitat ==
Desert myrtle-heath grows in mallee scrub on sand dunes and sandplains from the Eyre Peninsula and Kangaroo Island in South Australia to south-western New South Wales and to near Ballarat in Victoria.
