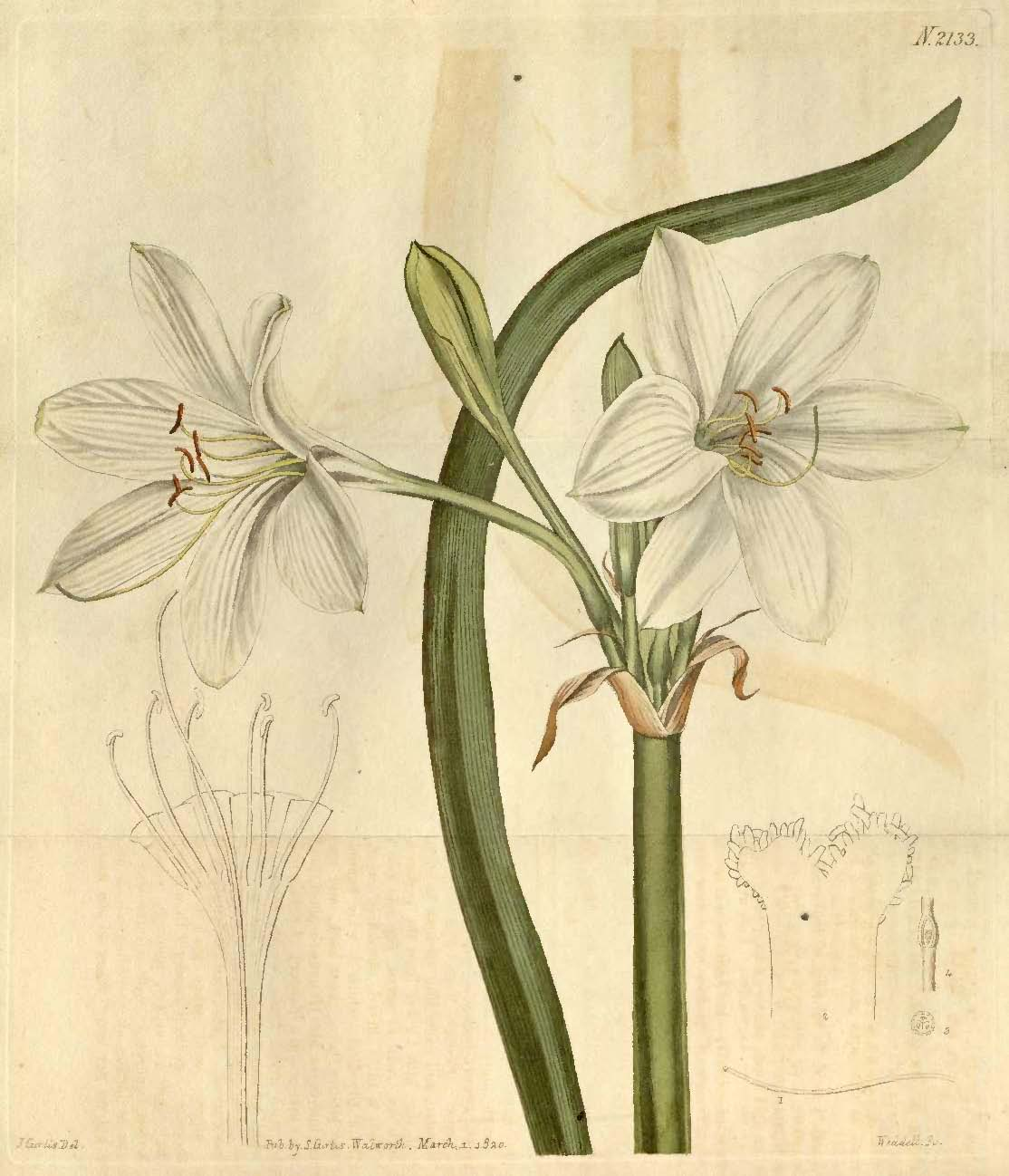

Scientific classification
- Kingdom: Plantae
- Clade: Tracheophytes
- Clade: Angiosperms
- Clade: Monocots
- Order: Asparagales
- Family: Amaryllidaceae
- Subfamily: Amaryllidoideae
- Genus: Crinum
- Species: C. flaccidum

Binomial name
- Crinum flaccidum Herb.
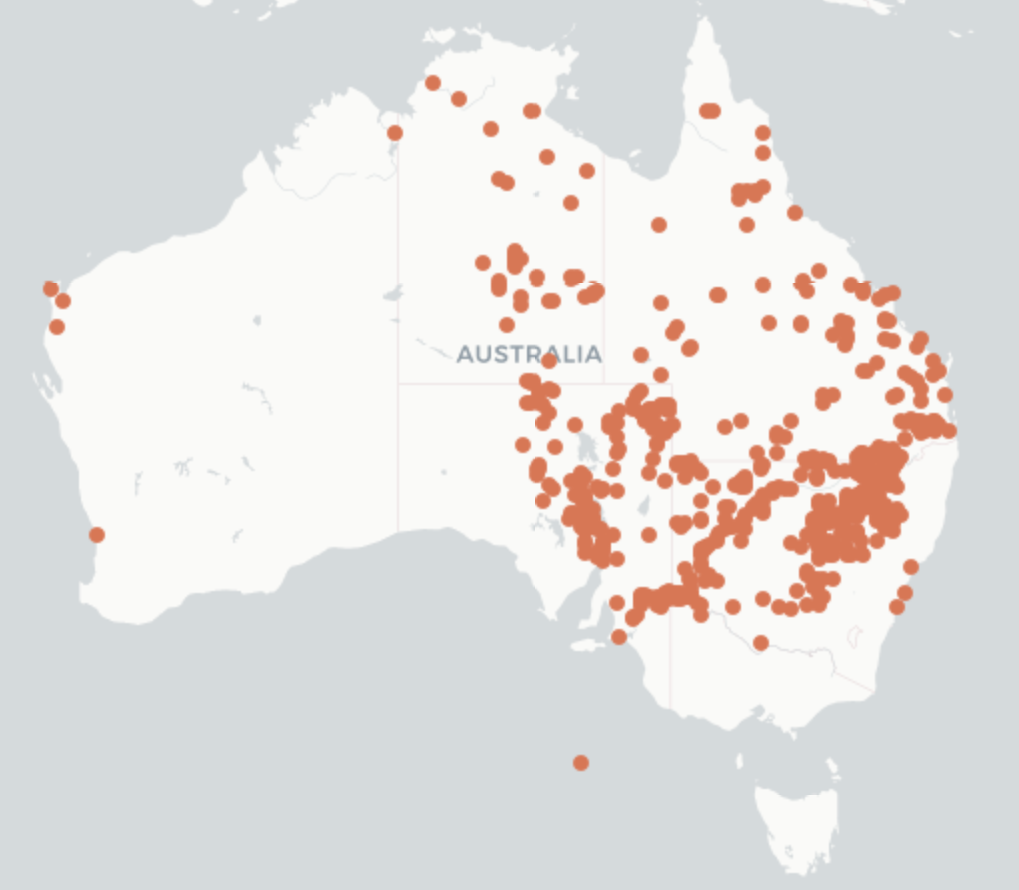
- Australian occurrence records of Crinum Flaccidum AVH

Synonyms
- Amaryllis australasica Ker Gawl.; Amaryllis australis Spreng.; Amaryllis flaccida Weinm.; Crinum angustifolium var. blandum (Sweet) Baker; Crinum arenarium var. blandum Sweet; Crinum corynorrhizum F.Muell.; Crinum pestilentis F.M.Bailey; Crinum weinmannii M.Roem.; Taenais australasiae (Ker Gawl.) Salisb.

= Crinum flaccidum =

Species of flowering plant

Crinum flaccidum, known variously as the Darling lily, Murray lily or Macquarie lily, is a species of flowering plant in the family Amaryllidaceae. It is native to inland Australia. The Darling river people — the Paakantyi — called this plant paalampaltharu.

== Description and taxonomy ==
Crinum spp. are large plants with heavy umbels of thin segmented lily-like flowers. These plants are dormant at certain times of the year giving the perception of appearance and then disappearance. The plant emerges from an egg-shaped bulb with flat, soft 50cm long x 1-4cm wide leaves. Crinum spp. are typically found on inland floodways and near rivers.

In the 1889 book The useful native plants of Australia, the botanist Joseph Henry Maiden wrote:

"This exceedingly handsome white-flowered plant, which grows back from the Darling, has bulbs which yield a fair arrowroot. On one occasion, near the town of Wilcannia, a man earned a handsome sum by making this substance when flour was all but unobtainable. South Australia, Victoria, New South Wales, and Queensland."

Maiden also gave three synonyms:

- Crinum flaccidum Herb.
- Amaryllis australasica Ker
- Crinum australis Spreng.

Historically, the genus Crinum has been placed in the Amaryllidaceae or Liliaceae families however the current consensus is that it belongs to the former. There are about 180 Crinum species worldwide and 14 species recognised in Australia with 13 of these native to Australia. C. flaccidum suffers from taxonomic uncertainty due to the widespread hybridisation in the genus in addition to morphological variability within and among populations.

== Distribution and habitat ==
Crinum spp. are found in tropical and subtropical regions throughout the world including Africa, Australasia and India. Crinum spp. is found in all mainland states of Australia. C. flaccidum is found broadly scattered along floodways of inland river systems, primarily on the eastern half of Australia. These areas include eastern Northern Territory, Queensland, New South Wales, north-eastern Victoria and eastern South Australia. Additionally, disjunction populations can be found in the north-west corner of Western Australia.

== Uses ==
For centuries, Crinum spp. have been used in traditional medicine and ailments. The bulbs of C. flaccidum were used by Australia's First Nations people as a rich source of starch which when cooked and then eaten would provide a source of arrowroot/gruel. However, other reports suggest that local people agree that the bulb is poisonous.

Recent research into the potential pharmacological uses of Crinum spp. have led to the discovery of over 150 different alkaloids. Noted effects included: analgesic, anticholinergic, antitumor and antiviral.

== Toxicity ==
C. flaccidum is often mistaken for "true lilies" (Liliaceae family) due to similar basal leaf conformation. However, C. flaccidum does not belong to the Liliaceae family and therefore does not share the toxicities of this family. C. flaccidum is reported to be toxic to humans, though the evidence is inconsistent. The responsible toxin is unknown yet it is suspected to be isoquinoline phenanthridine alkaloids. The risk of danger is considered to be low however vomiting can occur when camping among a large number of flowering plants.

== Reproduction and dispersal ==
A large diversity of insects visit the flowering C. flaccidum during March and early April. Anthesis occurs at dusk which is a reflective preference of the sphingophily or phalenophilous moth pollination method found in the Crinum genus. Pollinators seen interacting with C. flaccidum include several species of hawkmoth and Honey bees. Pollination occurs via the sphingid moth as these moths are the only insects with the necessary mouth parts required to collect the nectar from the long floral hypanthia. The seed formed by the plant has a corky coat and weighs approximately 5.3 g (0.19 oz), which is relatively large. The seed can germinate without an external supply of water and on occasion will do so whilst still on the parent plant. Birds have reportedly been seen feeding on the flowers of Crinum spp. on occasion however the nectar contents are considered to be fairly dilute in nutritional value.

== Evolution and genetic diversity ==
There are 13 species of the Crinum genus that are native to Australia with one of these being C. flaccidum. More recently, genetic marking suggests that the C. flaccidum species complex can be split into the 2 taxa of C. luteolum and C. flaccidum species. C. luteolum represents the different morphotypes and genetic differences found in the Lake Eyre basin and Flinders Ranges whilst C. flaccidum is the species found in the Murray–Darling basin. It is believed that the common ancestor of C. luteolum and C. flaccidum is C. arenarium which through flood-facilitated long-distance dispersion and isolation became genetically diverse.

== Gallery ==
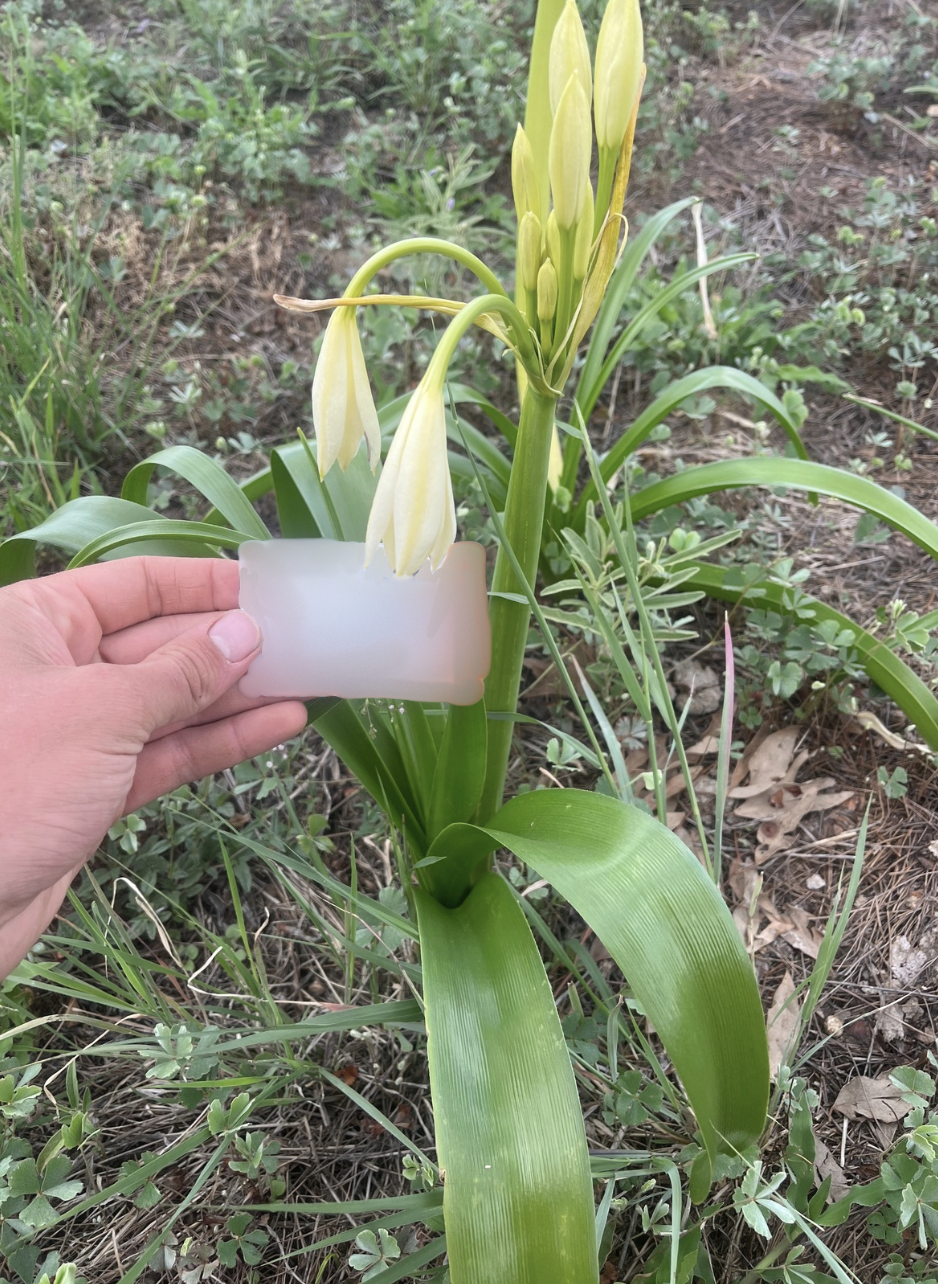

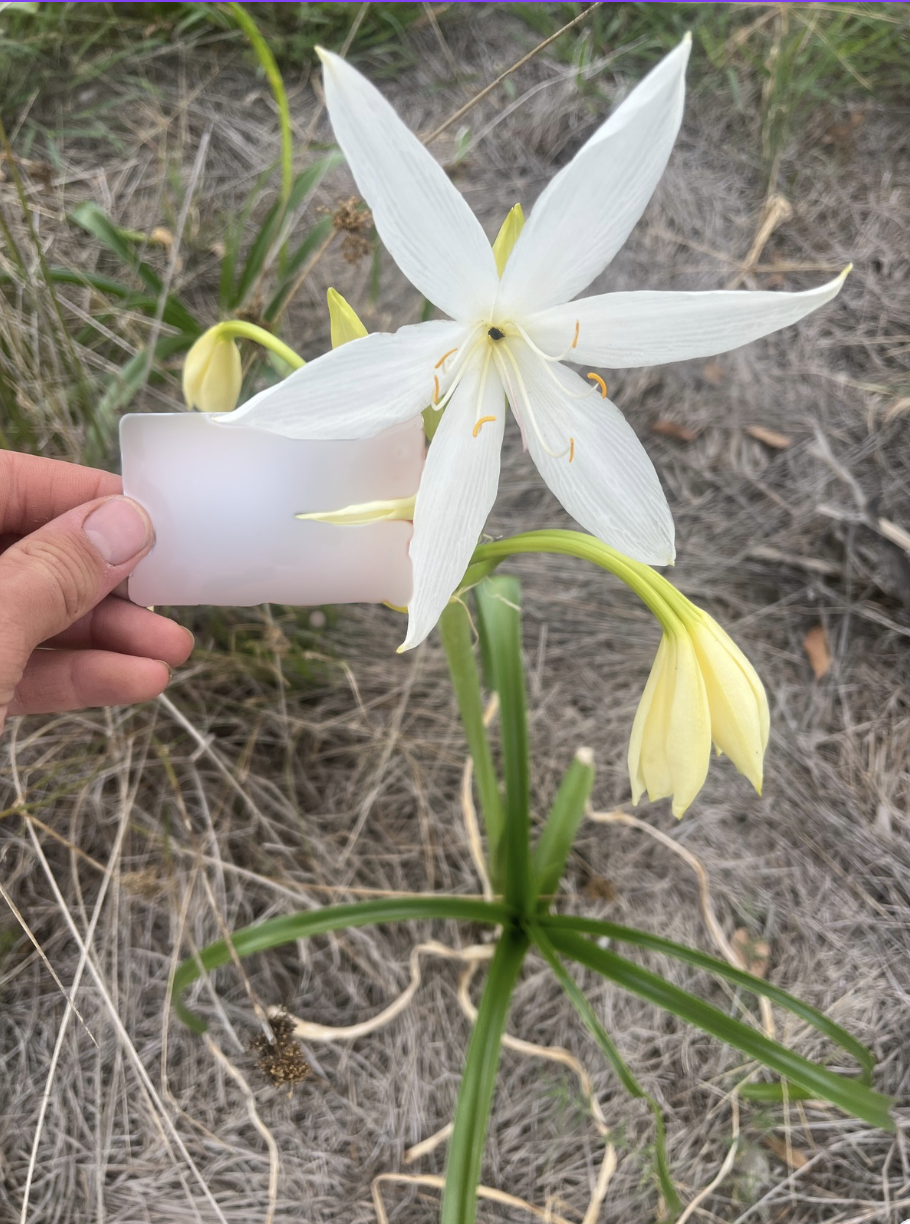
