= Paintbrush lily =

Paintbrush lily is a common name for several plants and may refer to:

- the genus Haemanthus collectively
- Haemanthus albiflos, sometimes called "white paintbrush lily", a white-flowered bulbous plant native to southern Africa
- Haemanthus coccineus, a scarlet-flowered bulbous plant native to southern Africa
- Scadoxus puniceus, a red-flowered bulbous plant native to southern and eastern Africa

== See also ==
- Castilleja, the paintbrush flowers of western North America
- Ageratum houstonianum, Mexican paintbrush
