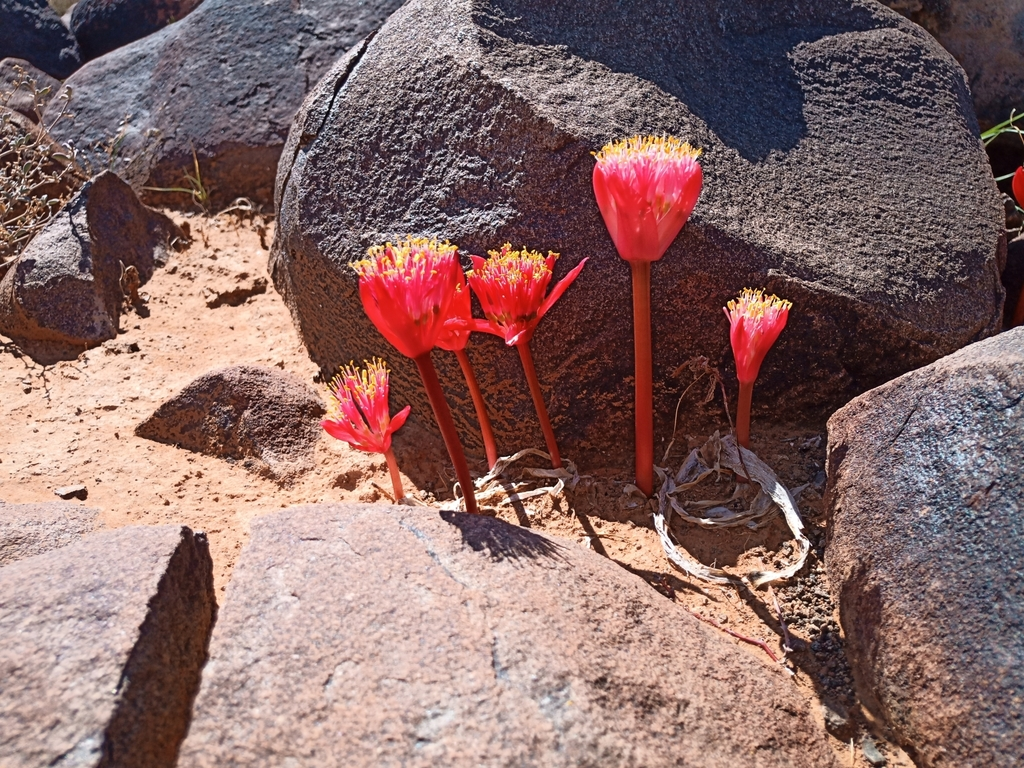

Scientific classification
- Kingdom: Plantae
- Clade: Tracheophytes
- Clade: Angiosperms
- Clade: Monocots
- Order: Asparagales
- Family: Amaryllidaceae
- Subfamily: Amaryllidoideae
- Genus: Haemanthus
- Species: H. barkerae

Binomial name
- Haemanthus barkerae Snijman
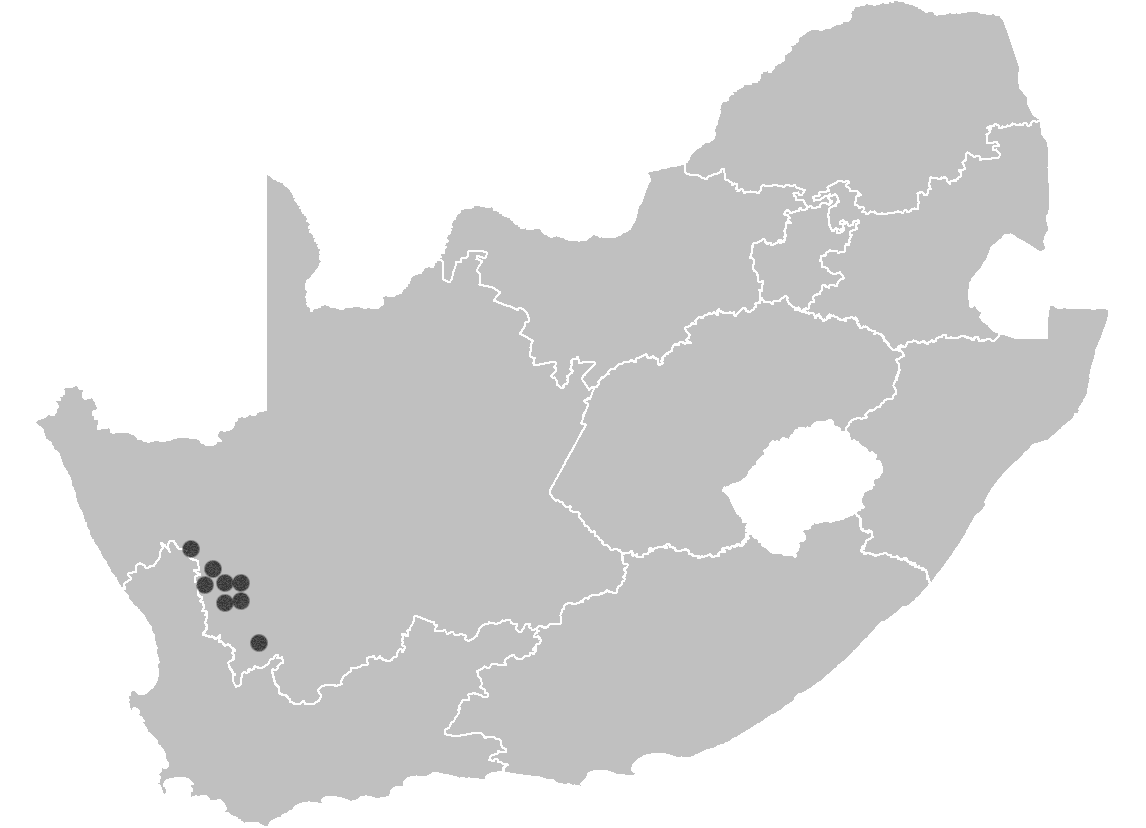
- Distribution over South Africa

= Haemanthus barkerae =

Species of flowering plant

Haemanthus barkerae is a South African bulbous geophyte in the genus Haemanthus. H. barkerae is found in the Western Cape from the Bokkeveld Mountains near Nieuwoudtville and the foothills of the Roggeveld Mountains, to the Hantamsberg near Calvinia, and bounded to the north and south by Loeriesfontein and the Tanqua Karoo.

For many years herbarium collections of H. pumilio included specimens of a second species which went unnoticed because of its similarity - this similar but distinct species was named H. barkerae. The specific epithet commemorates Winsome Fanny Barker (1907–1994), erstwhile Curator of the Compton Herbarium at Kirstenbosch National Botanical Garden in Cape Town, and noted for her work on Amaryllidaceae, Liliaceae and Haemodoraceae.

H. barkerae tends to grow in clumps in heavy clay soils in the shelter of rocks or shrubs. It has pale to deep pink flowerheads. The two leaves (occasionally one) last from May to October, are narrowly ligulate to near elliptic, are almost erect and appear after the flowers which bloom between March and April. The abaxial surfaces of the leaves are conspicuously barred with dark green and maroon.
