= Haemanthus tristis =

Scientific classification
- Kingdom: Plantae
- Clade: Tracheophytes
- Clade: Angiosperms
- Clade: Monocots
- Order: Asparagales
- Family: Amaryllidaceae
- Subfamily: Amaryllidoideae
- Genus: Haemanthus
- Species: H. tristis

Binomial name
- Haemanthus tristis Snijman (1984)

Species of flowering plant

Haemanthus tristis is a perennial flowering plant and geophyte belonging to the genus Haemanthus. The species is endemic to the Northern Cape and the Western Cape and occurs in the southeastern Tankwa Karoo, where there are five subpopulations.
