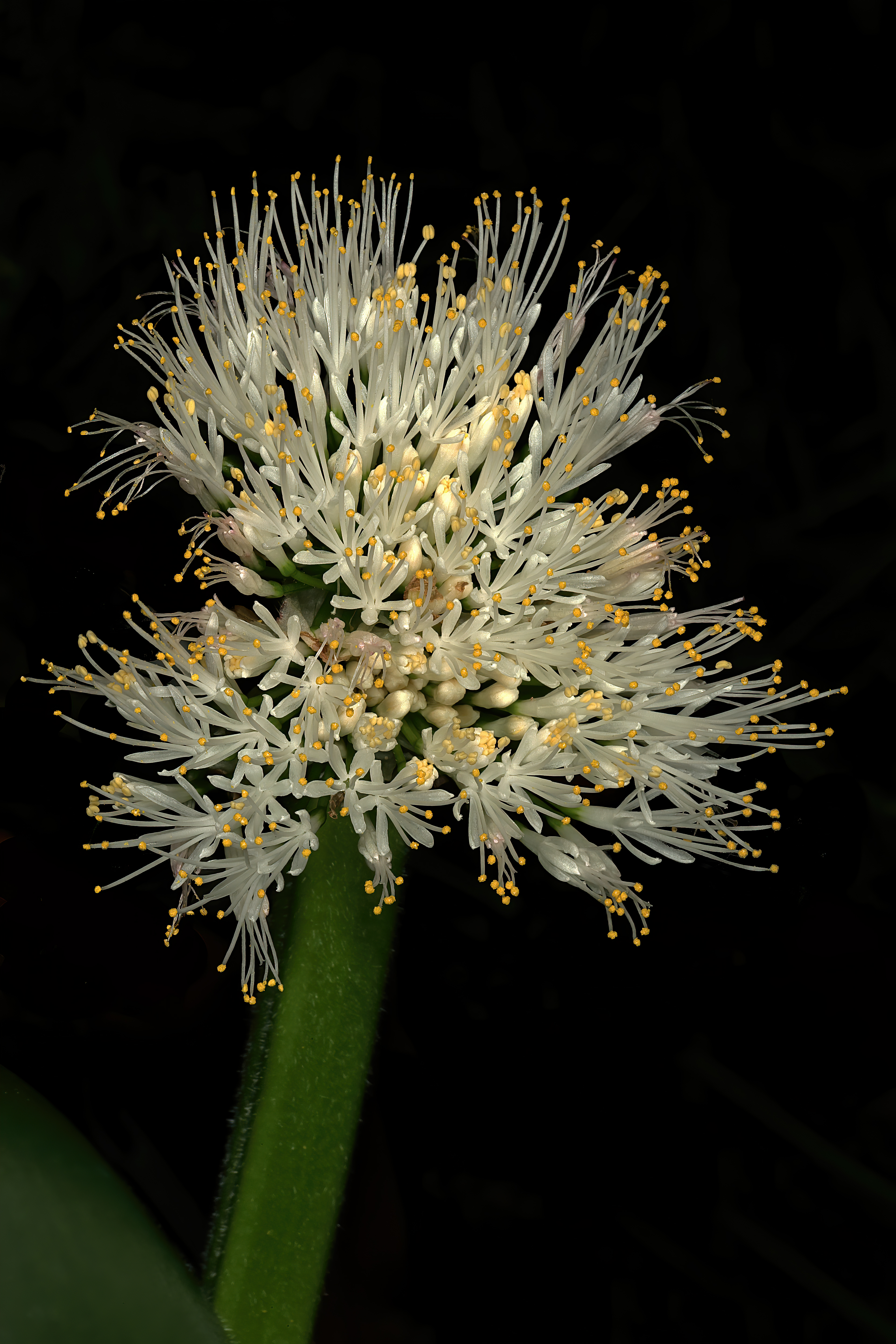

Scientific classification
- Kingdom: Plantae
- Clade: Tracheophytes
- Clade: Angiosperms
- Clade: Monocots
- Order: Asparagales
- Family: Amaryllidaceae
- Subfamily: Amaryllidoideae
- Genus: Haemanthus
- Species: H. humilis

Binomial name
- Haemanthus humilis Jacq., (1804)

Synonyms
- Melicho humilis (Jacq.) Salisb.

= Haemanthus humilis =

Species of flowering plant

Haemanthus humilis is a perennial flowering plant and geophyte belonging to the genus Haemanthus. The species is native to South Africa, it occurs in every province, as well as Botswana and Lesotho.

There are two subspecies:

- Haemanthus humilis subsp. hirsutus (Baker) Snijman
- Haemanthus humilis subsp. humilis
