= Pauline Perry =

Pauline Perry may refer to:

- Pauline Perry, Baroness Perry of Southwark (born 1931), British educator, academic and politician
- Pauline Lesley Perry (1927-2015), South African botanist, horticulturalist and plant collector
