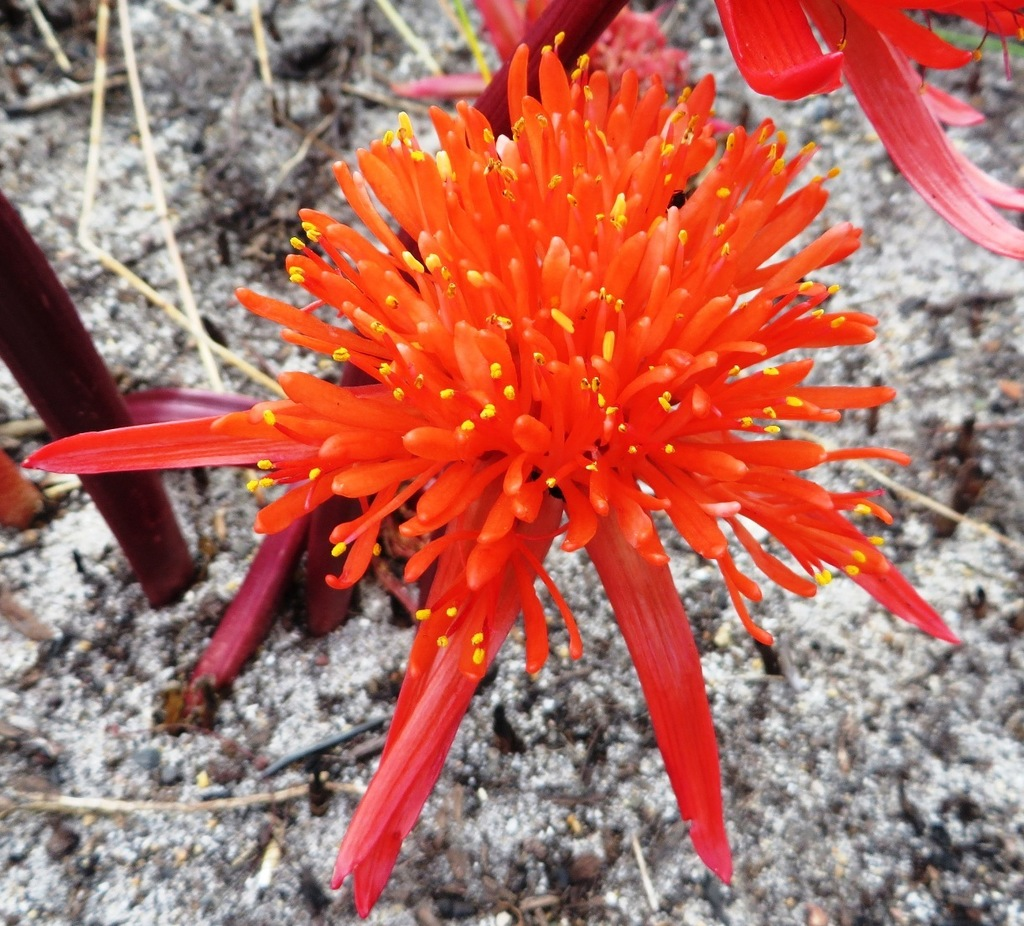

Scientific classification
- Kingdom: Plantae
- Clade: Tracheophytes
- Clade: Angiosperms
- Clade: Monocots
- Order: Asparagales
- Family: Amaryllidaceae
- Subfamily: Amaryllidoideae
- Genus: Haemanthus
- Species: H. canaliculatus

Binomial name
- Haemanthus canaliculatus Levyns
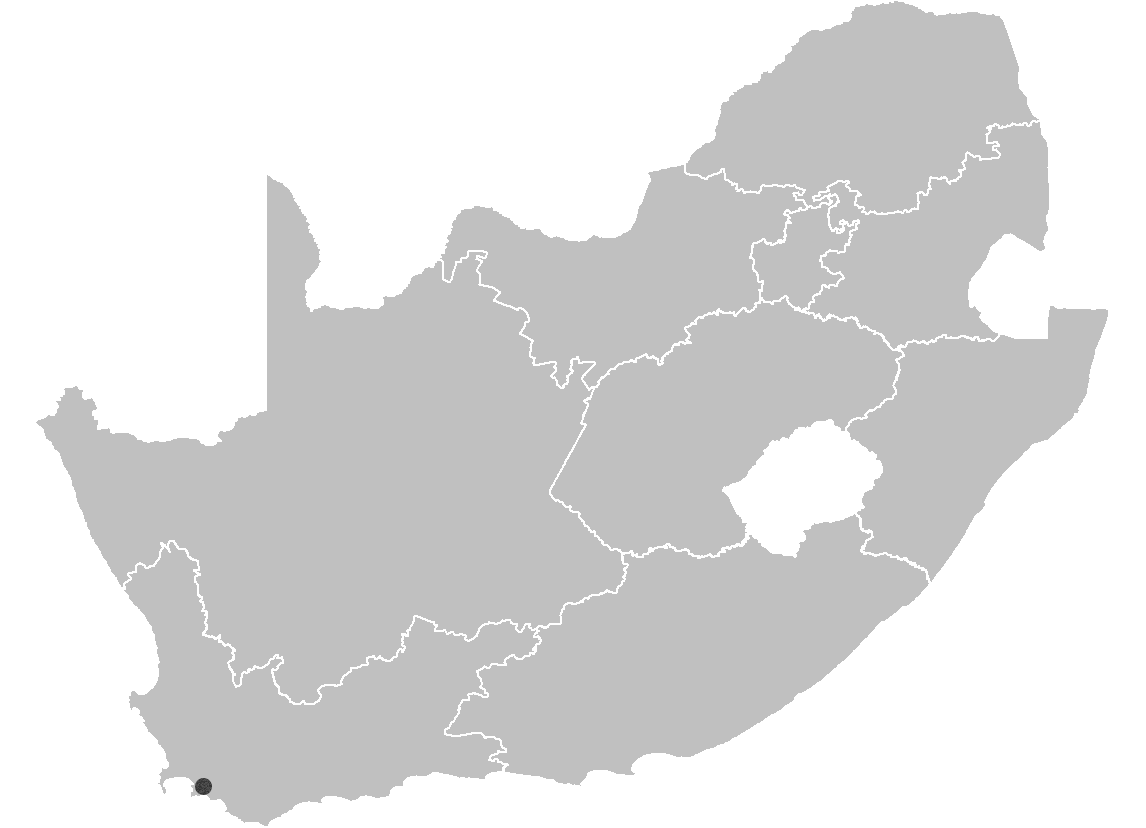
- Distribution over South Africa

= Haemanthus canaliculatus =

Species of flowering plant

Haemanthus canaliculatus ('canaliculatus': Latin 'with small channel or groove') is a South African bulbous geophyte in the genus Haemanthus in the family Amaryllidaceae. The common name is fireball lily. It is found only over a small area in the Western Cape between Kleinmond and Rooiels, growing at about 30 m above sea level with an annual rainfall of 650 mm. Its favoured habitat is under dense bush in seasonally inundated shallow depressions, where it usually occurs in clumps. The leaf-bases or tunics of the bulb are thick, fleshy, distichous and loosely separated as in the spread fingers on a hand cf. Haemanthus pubescens. Leaves are from one to four, red-barred at the base, held in a sub-erect position and appear after the flowers. The peduncle is up to 200 mm long with 5-7 spathe valves that are bright red to pink in colour. Fruits are about 20 mm in diameter and reddish. Seeds are shiny and deep red.

H. canaliculatus was named for the distinctive groove on the upper surface of the narrow, succulent leaves formed by the arching over of the leaf edges. It was collected for the first time at Betty's Bay in 1943 following a fire, but was only described after another fire by Margaret Levyns in the Journal of South African Botany in 1966. The belief has arisen that fires are necessary to stimulate flowering, but since the same species flowers regularly under cultivation, it would seem as if clearing of the undergrowth is the important requirement.

Sightings

H. canaliculatus was seen on 24 January 2016 on the farm Breevlei which is located close to the town of Avontuur in the Western Cape, South Africa. The veld had recently burnt between 31 December 2015 and 4 January 2016. The farm is located at between 900 and 1000 meters above sea level and roughly 400 km from its usual habitat.
