= Paintbrush (disambiguation) =

A paintbrush is a brush used to apply paint or sometimes ink.

Paintbrush may also refer to:

== Plants ==
- Castilleja (commonly "Indian paintbrush"), a genus of about 200 species of annual and perennial herbaceous plants
- Haemanthus albiflos (sometimes "paintbrush"), a species of flowering plant in the family Amaryllidaceae, native to South Africa
- Haemanthus coccineus (also "paintbrush lily"), a bulbous geophyte in the genus Haemanthus, native to Southern Africa

== Software ==
- Microsoft Paintbrush, former name of Microsoft Paint, a simple computer graphics app
- Paintbrush, a raster image editor for macOS
- PC Paintbrush, graphics editing software
