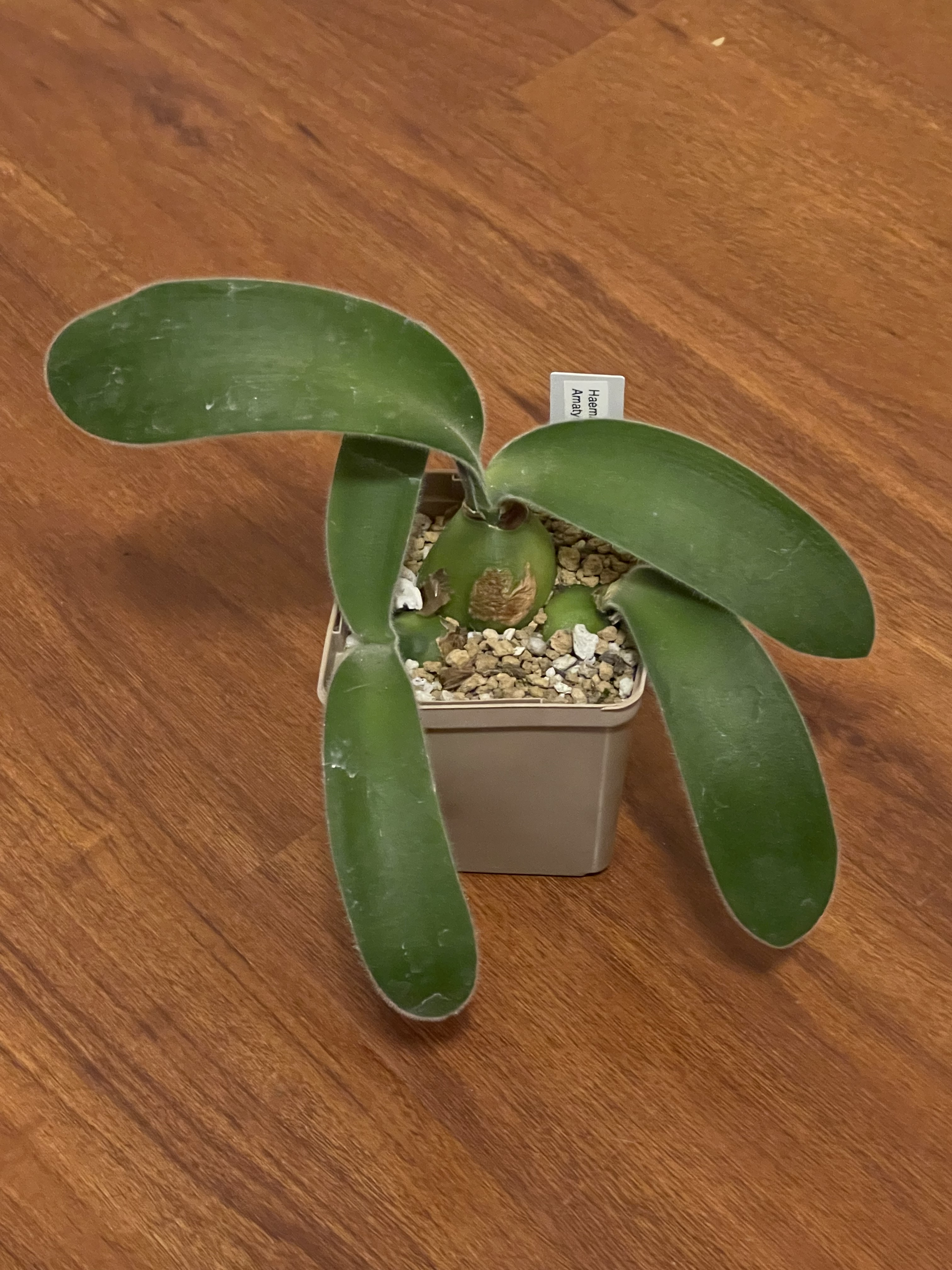

Scientific classification
- Kingdom: Plantae
- Clade: Tracheophytes
- Clade: Angiosperms
- Clade: Monocots
- Order: Asparagales
- Family: Amaryllidaceae
- Subfamily: Amaryllidoideae
- Genus: Haemanthus
- Species: H. pauculifolius

Binomial name
- Haemanthus pauculifolius Snijman & A.E.van Wyk

= Haemanthus pauculifolius =

Species of plant

Haemanthus pauculifolius is a species of Haemanthus native to Mpumalanga province of South Africa and Eswatini first described in 1993.

== Description ==
Haemanthus pauculifolius is a clumping blub, and each blub normally gets 2 leaves, opposite to each other with a thick layer of trichomes. Leaves are long, and not as large as some other Haemanthus species. This is the most recently described species of them.

== Flowers ==
The flowers are white, and like most haemanthus flowers.

== Images ==
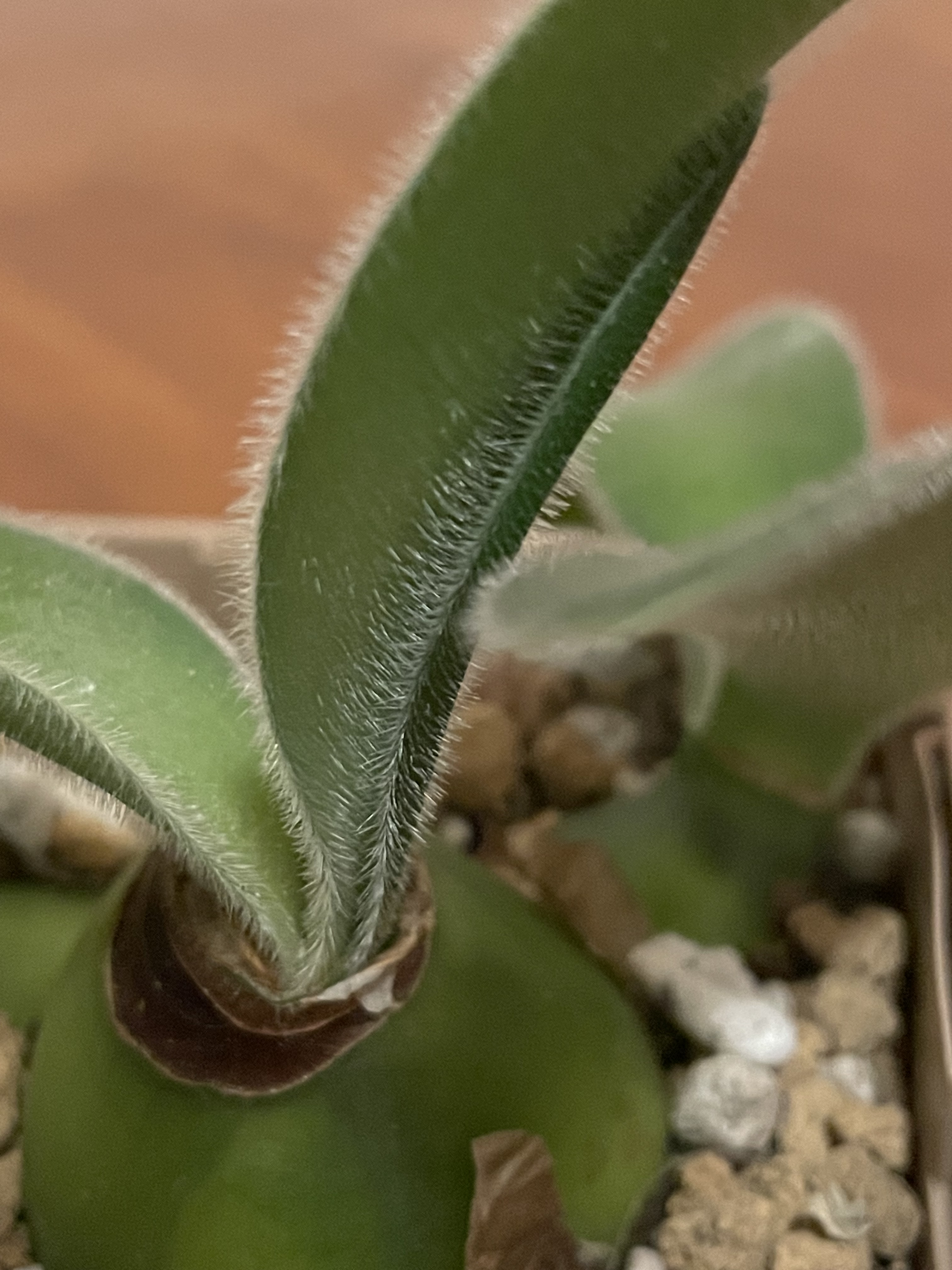
Picture of leaves showing trichomes

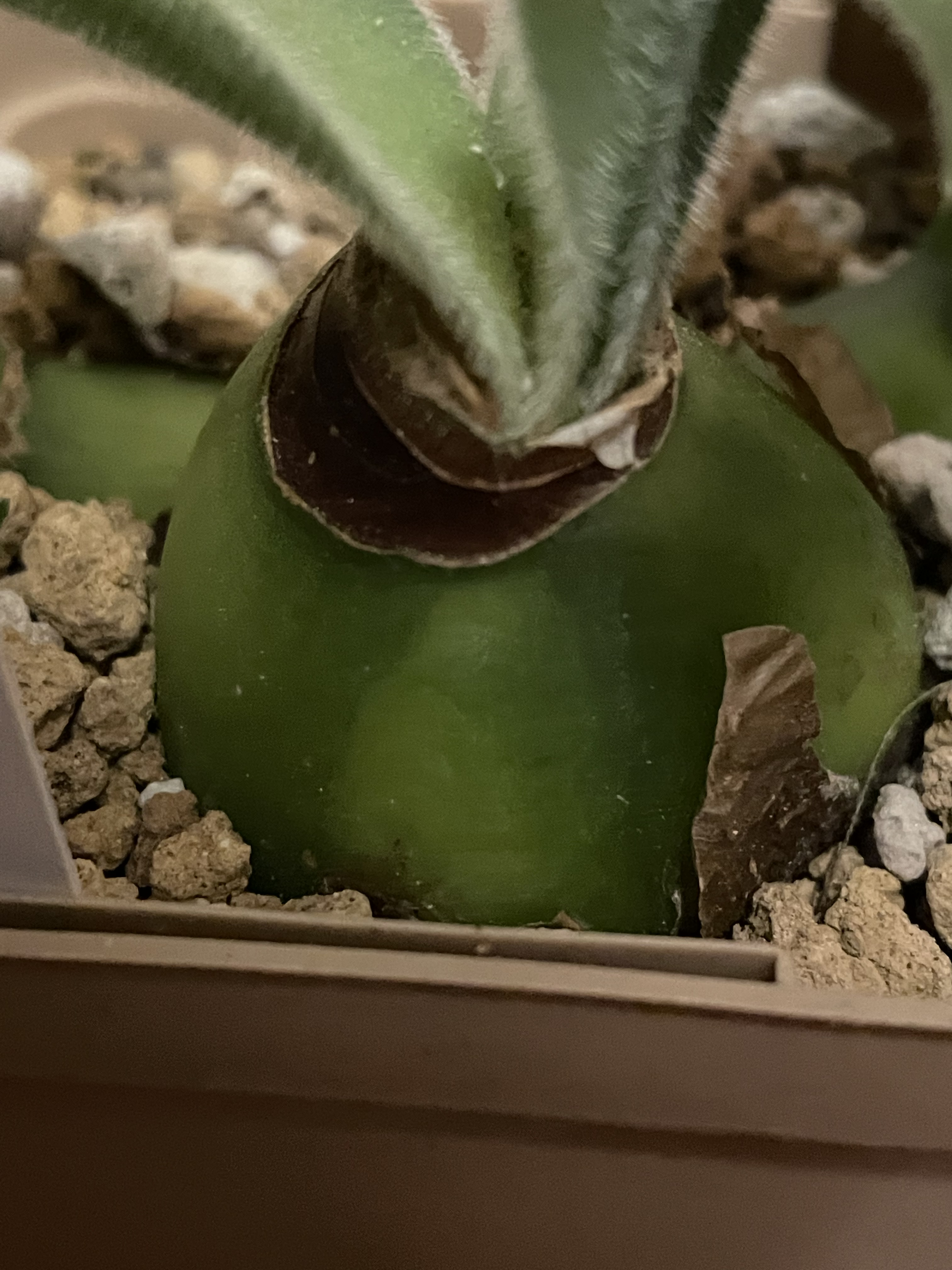
Bulbs
