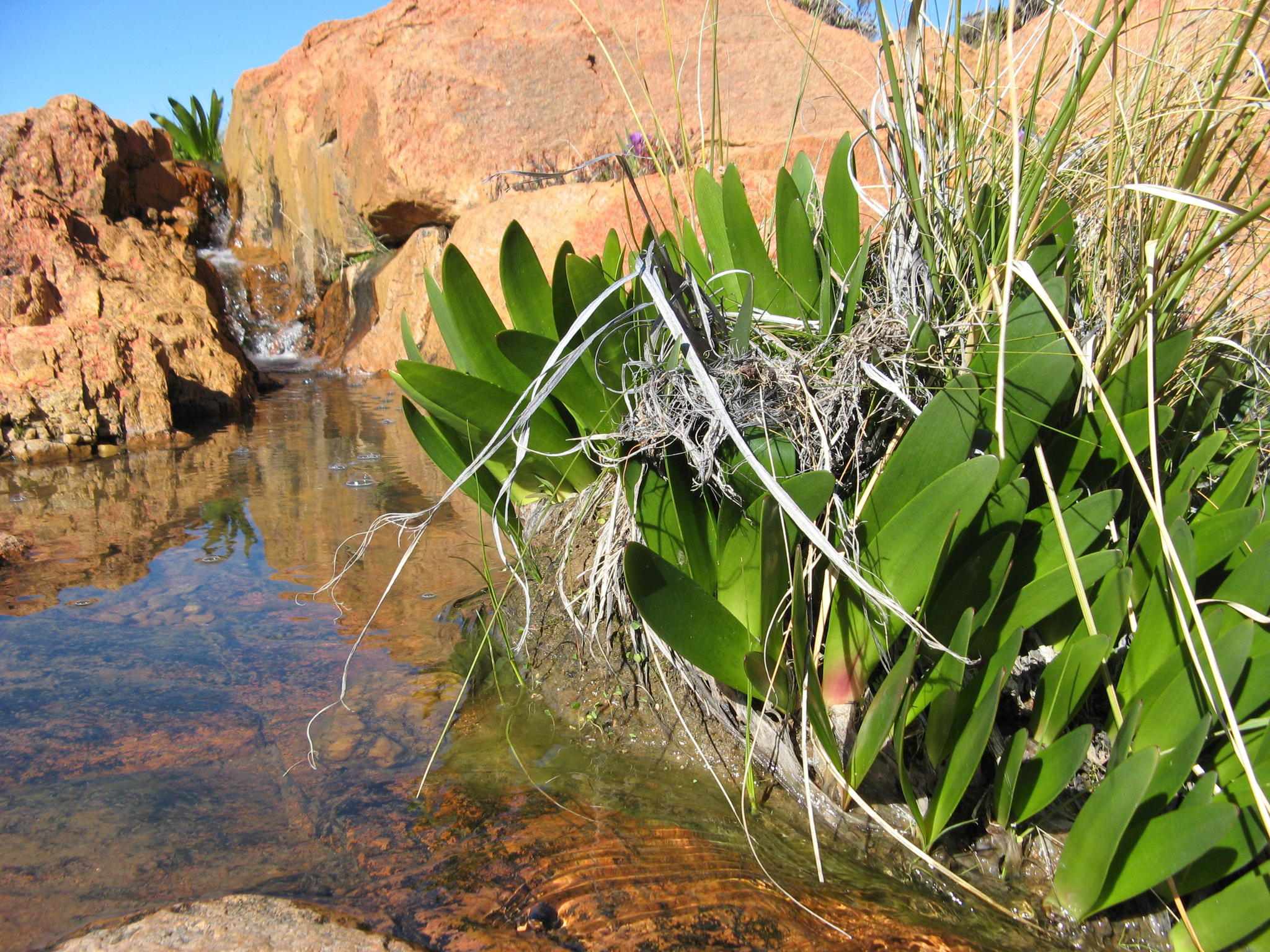

Conservation status
- Endangered (SANBI Red List)

Scientific classification
- Kingdom: Plantae
- Clade: Embryophytes
- Clade: Tracheophytes
- Clade: Angiosperms
- Clade: Monocots
- Order: Asparagales
- Family: Amaryllidaceae
- Subfamily: Amaryllidoideae
- Genus: Haemanthus
- Species: H. graniticus

Binomial name
- Haemanthus graniticus Snijman

= Haemanthus graniticus =

Species of flowering plant

Haemanthus graniticus is a perennial flowering plant and geophyte that belongs to the genus Haemanthus and is native to the Renosterveld. The species is endemic to the Northern Cape. There are three subpopulations in an area of occurrence of 2,500 km^{2} (970 sq mi), it occurs from Springbok to the Kamiesberge. The plant is threatened by its habitat being ploughed up for agricultural purposes, and the illegal collection of the plants by horticulturalists.
