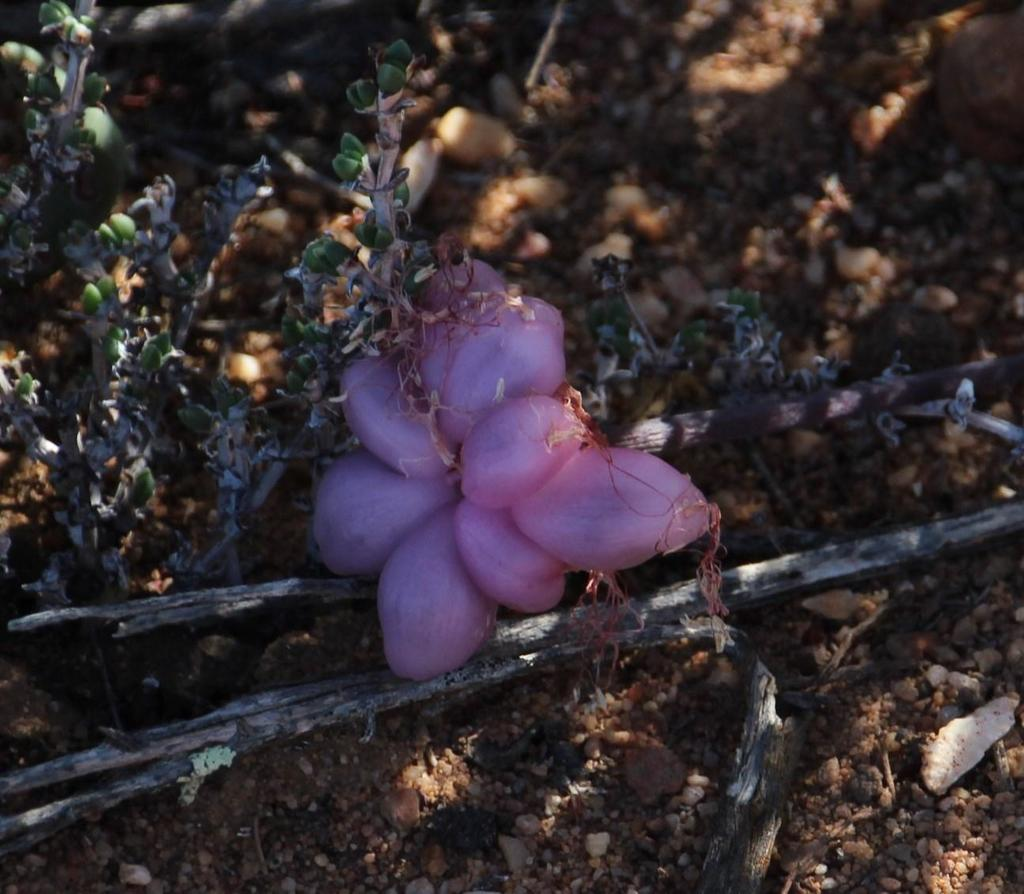

Scientific classification
- Kingdom: Plantae
- Clade: Tracheophytes
- Clade: Angiosperms
- Clade: Monocots
- Order: Asparagales
- Family: Amaryllidaceae
- Subfamily: Amaryllidoideae
- Genus: Haemanthus
- Species: H. crispus

Binomial name
- Haemanthus crispus Snijman
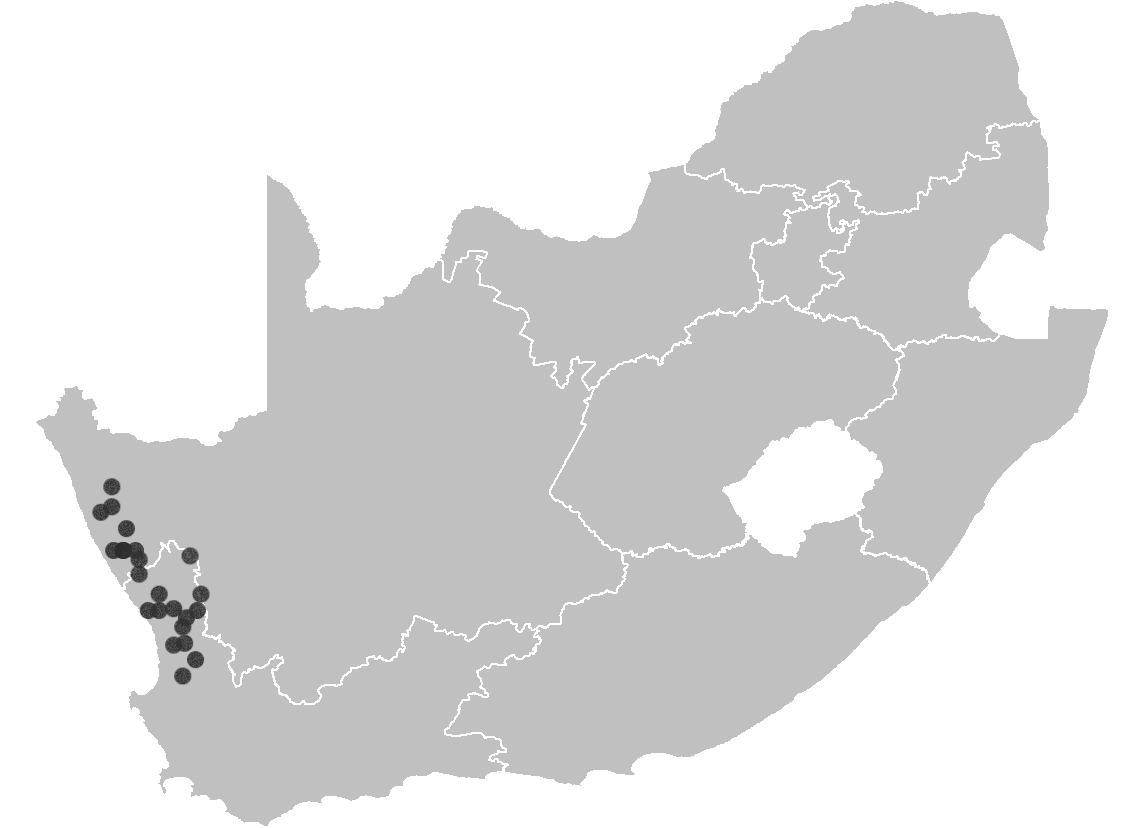
- Distribution over South Africa

Synonyms
- Haemanthus undulatus Herb. nom. illeg.

= Haemanthus crispus =

Species of flowering plant

Haemanthus crispus ('crispus': Latin 'curled' or 'crinkled') is a South African bulbous geophyte in the genus Haemanthus and occurring in Namaqualand which lies in the winter rainfall region. It is a common species and is found from Steinkopf to the Olifants River, growing from the coastal flats eastwards onto the stony, lower slopes of the first terrace, usually in heavy soils and often in the shade of low succulent shrubs.

H. crispus may be solitary or like many other Haemanthus species, gregarious and growing in clumps. It has from 1 to 3 leaves that appear soon after flowering. The leafblades may be hairy or glabrous, canaliculate and marked with maroon spots and bars on the abaxial surface. The leaf margins, occasionally edged in red, are strongly crisped or crinkled, ranging from throughout their length, to near the base only.

Flowers, appearing from March to May, and spathe valves are usually red, but occasionally pink. Fruits are up to 20 mm diameter, pink and pulpy when ripe, holding from one to four dark-red seeds.

Bulbs of H. crispus, unusually for winter rainfall species, have tunics whose edges form horizontal girdles, instead of the normal distichous arrangement.
