= Haemanthus unifoliatus =

Scientific classification
- Kingdom: Plantae
- Clade: Tracheophytes
- Clade: Angiosperms
- Clade: Monocots
- Order: Asparagales
- Family: Amaryllidaceae
- Subfamily: Amaryllidoideae
- Genus: Haemanthus
- Species: H. unifoliatus

Binomial name
- Haemanthus unifoliatus Snijman, (1984)

Species of flowering plant

Haemanthus unifoliatus is a perennial flowering plant and geophyte belonging to the genus Haemanthus. It is endemic to the Northern Cape.
