= Haemanthus dasyphyllus =

Scientific classification
- Kingdom: Plantae
- Clade: Embryophytes
- Clade: Tracheophytes
- Clade: Angiosperms
- Clade: Monocots
- Order: Asparagales
- Family: Amaryllidaceae
- Subfamily: Amaryllidoideae
- Genus: Haemanthus
- Species: H. dasyphyllus

Binomial name
- Haemanthus dasyphyllus Snijman
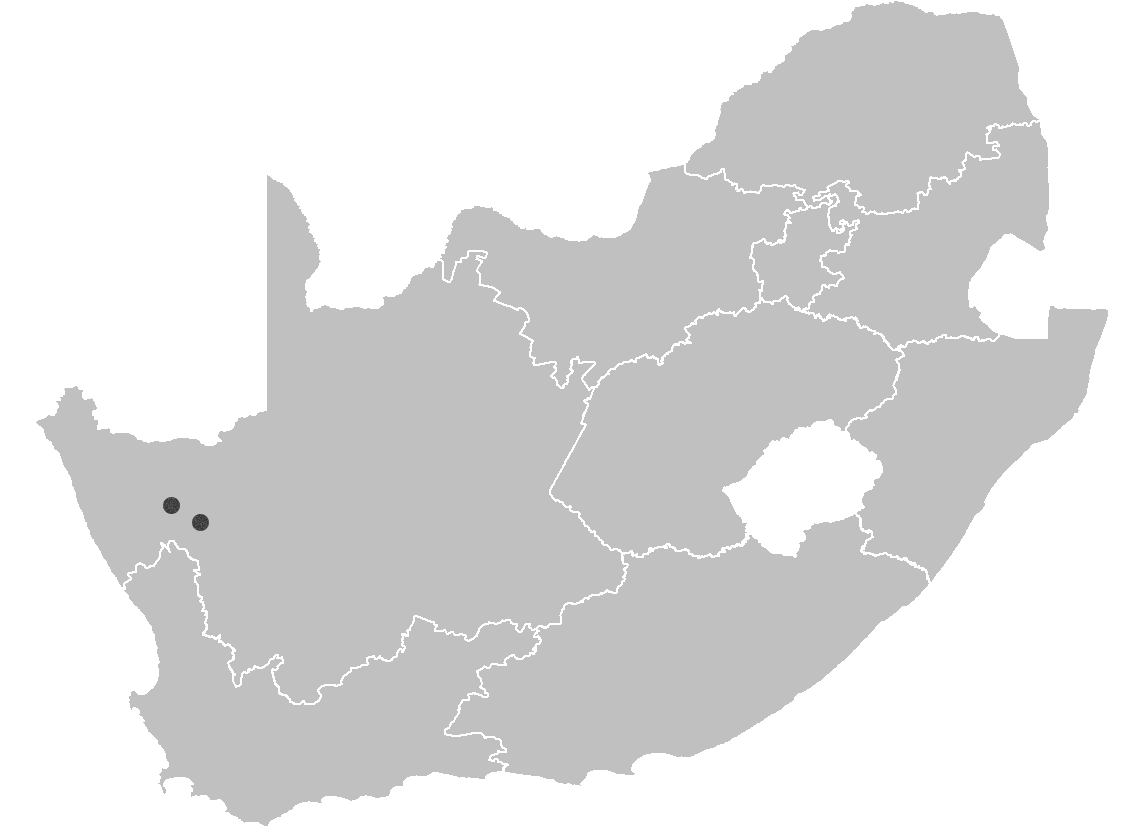
- Distribution over South Africa

Species of flowering plant

Haemanthus dasyphyllus ("dasyphyllus": Greek "downy/shaggy leaf") is a bulbous geophyte, endemic to South Africa. It is one of about 20 species in the genus Haemanthus, and is found near Loeriesfontein in Namaqualand.

H. dasyphyllus was discovered in 1926 on Langberg and Kubiskouberg north-west of Loeriesfontein and first described by Deidré Snijman in 1984. The localities are on shale deposits some 900m above sea level with an annual rainfall of 100–200mm. As the specific name implies, the lanceolate leaves are covered by soft, white hairs on either both surfaces, the lower surface or the margins. The leaves are held erect, are twisted and spotted with red at the base. The flowerhead is bright red and enclosed by 5–6 spathe valves. Peduncles are occasionally covered in soft, white hairs. Bulbs have imbricate and distichous tunics.

First collections of the plant were by Rudolf Marloth on the Kubiskouberg in 1926 and by J.P.H. Acocks in 1956. The specimens were filed under H. pubescens and H. tigrinus and temporarily forgotten until 1982 when M.B. Bayer collected some bulbs from the same vicinity. It soon became clear that the material was from a new species.
