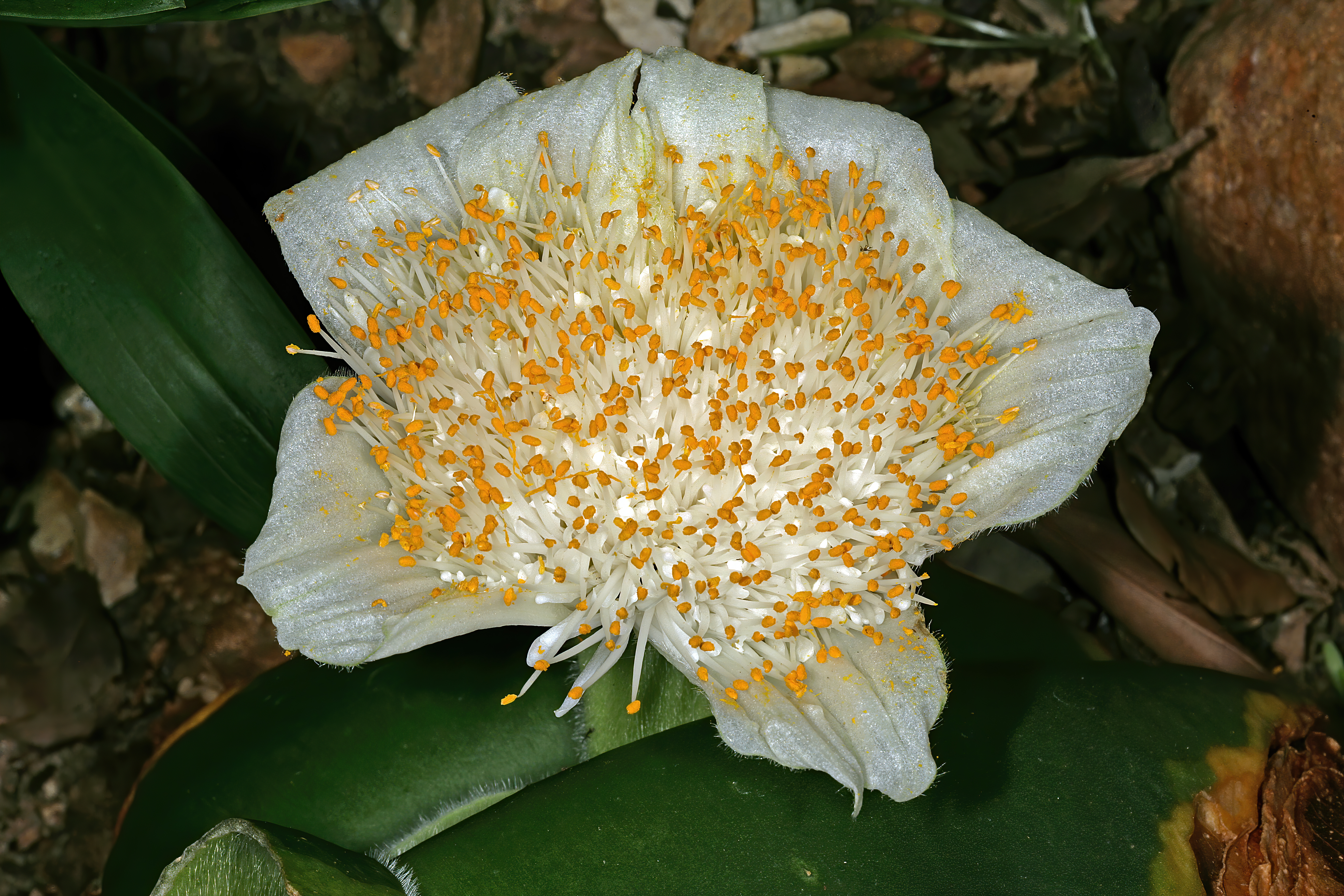

Conservation status
- Vulnerable (SANBI Red List)

Scientific classification
- Kingdom: Plantae
- Clade: Tracheophytes
- Clade: Angiosperms
- Clade: Monocots
- Order: Asparagales
- Family: Amaryllidaceae
- Subfamily: Amaryllidoideae
- Genus: Haemanthus
- Species: H. deformis

Binomial name
- Haemanthus deformis Hook.f.

Synonyms
- Haemanthus baurii T.Moore & Mast.; Haemanthus mackenii Baker

= Haemanthus deformis =

Species of flowering plant

Haemanthus deformis is a perennial flowering plant and geophyte belonging to the genus Haemanthus, in the family Amaryllidaceae. The species is endemic to the Eastern Cape and KwaZulu-Natal and occur from Umtata to Durban. The plant only grows in the forests near the coast and is threatened by the traditional medicine industry.
