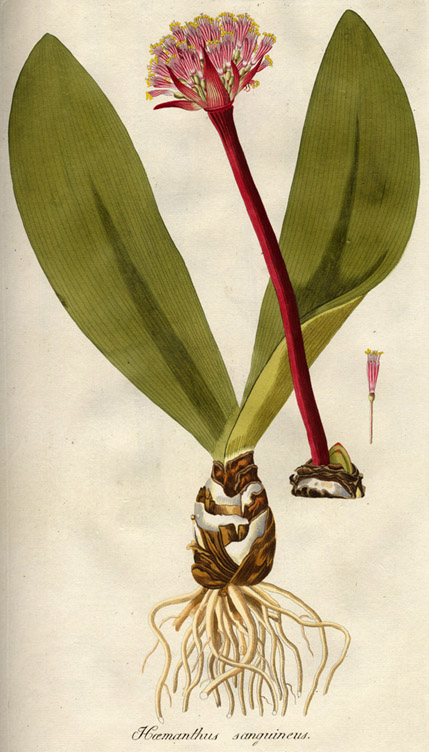
- Plate from Plantarum Rariorum Horti Caesarei Schoenbrunnensis Descriptiones et Icones; 1797-1798

Scientific classification
- Kingdom: Plantae
- Clade: Tracheophytes
- Clade: Angiosperms
- Clade: Monocots
- Order: Asparagales
- Family: Amaryllidaceae
- Subfamily: Amaryllidoideae
- Genus: Haemanthus
- Species: H. sanguineus

Binomial name
- Haemanthus sanguineus L.

Synonyms
- Haemanthus cooperi Baker; Haemanthus incarnatus Burch. ex Herb.; Haemanthus lambertianus Schult. & Schult.f.; Haemanthus obliquus Donn; Haemanthus orbicularis Donn; Haemanthus rotundifolius Ker Gawl.; Melicho sanguineus (Jacq.) Salisb. nom. inval.

= Haemanthus sanguineus =

Species of flowering plant

Haemanthus sanguineus is a South African bulbous geophyte in the genus Haemanthus that occurs in the fynbos vegetation of the Western Cape.

This endemic fynbos geophyte is dormant during the summer and cannot be seen. In the autumn a striking crimson inflorescence emerges from the ground. This consists of a crimson stem that bears a mass of tiny red, crimson and yellow individual flowers.

The plant then produces two circular leathery leaves in the autumn and winter. These lie flat on the ground and are typically edged with scarlet hairs. They are a deep green on the upper surface and underneath are covered in pink and red spots.

== See also ==
- Index: Fynbos

== Gallery ==
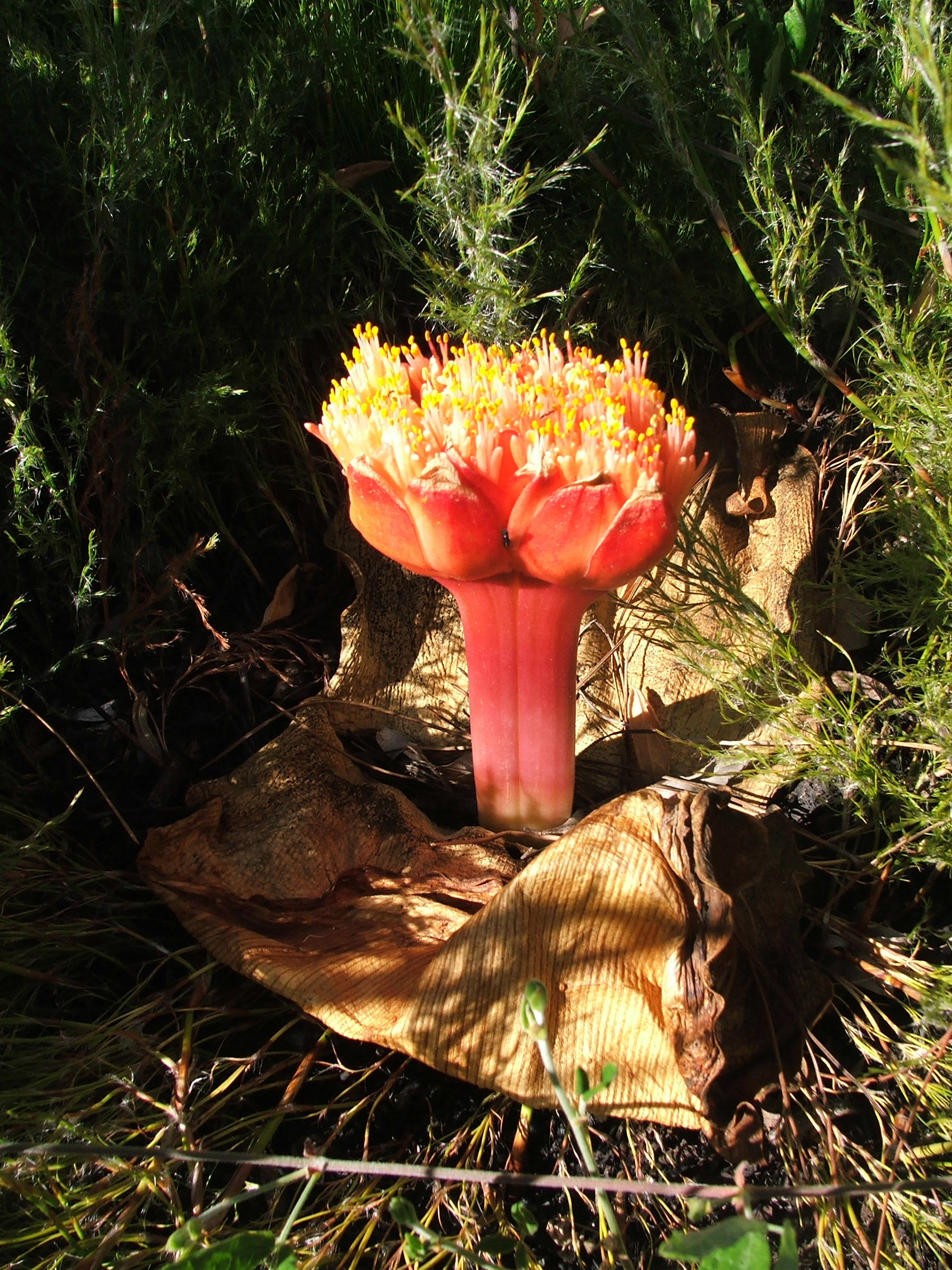
The inflorescence

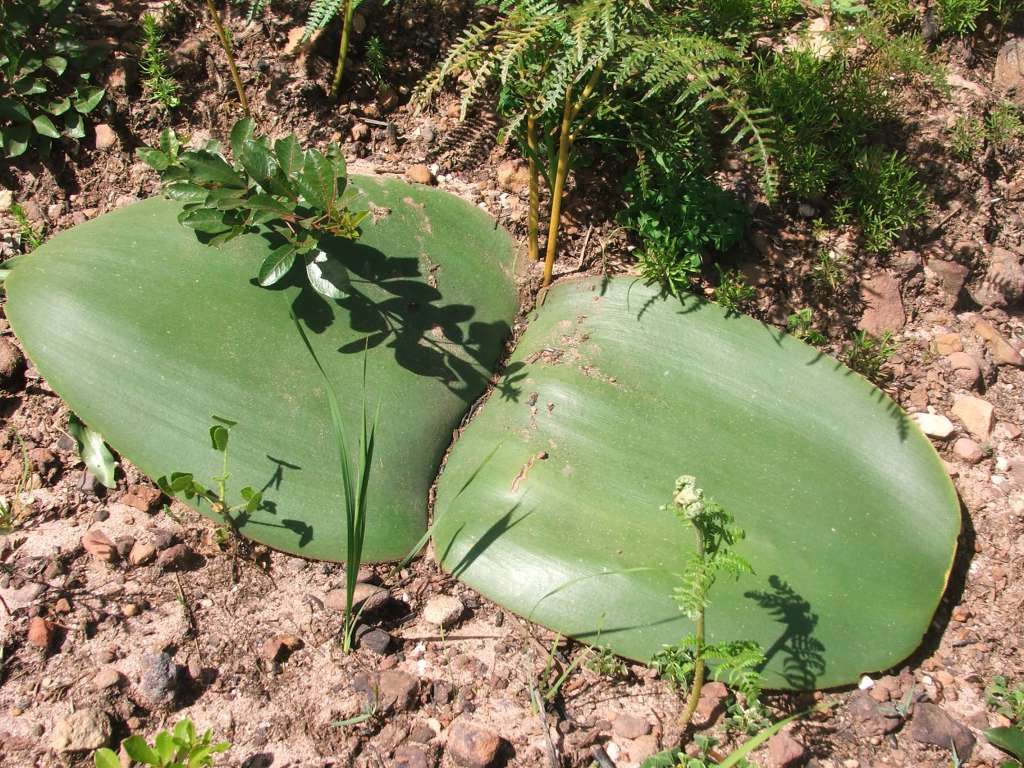
The flat, rounded leaves
