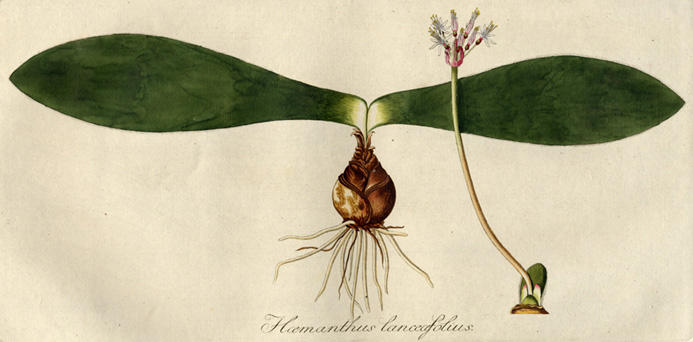

Scientific classification
- Kingdom: Plantae
- Clade: Tracheophytes
- Clade: Angiosperms
- Clade: Monocots
- Order: Asparagales
- Family: Amaryllidaceae
- Subfamily: Amaryllidoideae
- Genus: Haemanthus
- Species: H. lanceifolius

Binomial name
- Haemanthus lanceifolius Jacq., (1797)

Synonyms
- Melicho lanceifolia (Jacq.) Salisb.; Serena lanceifolia (Jacq.) Raf.

= Haemanthus lanceifolius =

Species of flowering plant

Haemanthus lanceifolius is a perennial flowering plant and geophyte belonging to the genus Haemanthus.

== Description ==
The species is endemic to the Northern Cape and the Western Cape and occurs from Vanrhynsdorp to Calvinia. There are four subpopulations in an area of occurrence of 750 km². The species has lost 30% of its habitat due to crop cultivation over the past 60 years. One of the four subpopulations was almost lost in 2004 due to crop cultivation, but after objections from the local conservation association, the landowner decided to preserve it. The remaining three subpopulations are threatened by invasive plants.
