= Haemanthus avasmontanus =

Conservation status
- Least Concern (IUCN 3.1)

Scientific classification
- Kingdom: Plantae
- Clade: Tracheophytes
- Clade: Angiosperms
- Clade: Monocots
- Order: Asparagales
- Family: Amaryllidaceae
- Subfamily: Amaryllidoideae
- Genus: Haemanthus
- Species: H. avasmontanus

Binomial name
- Haemanthus avasmontanus Dinter
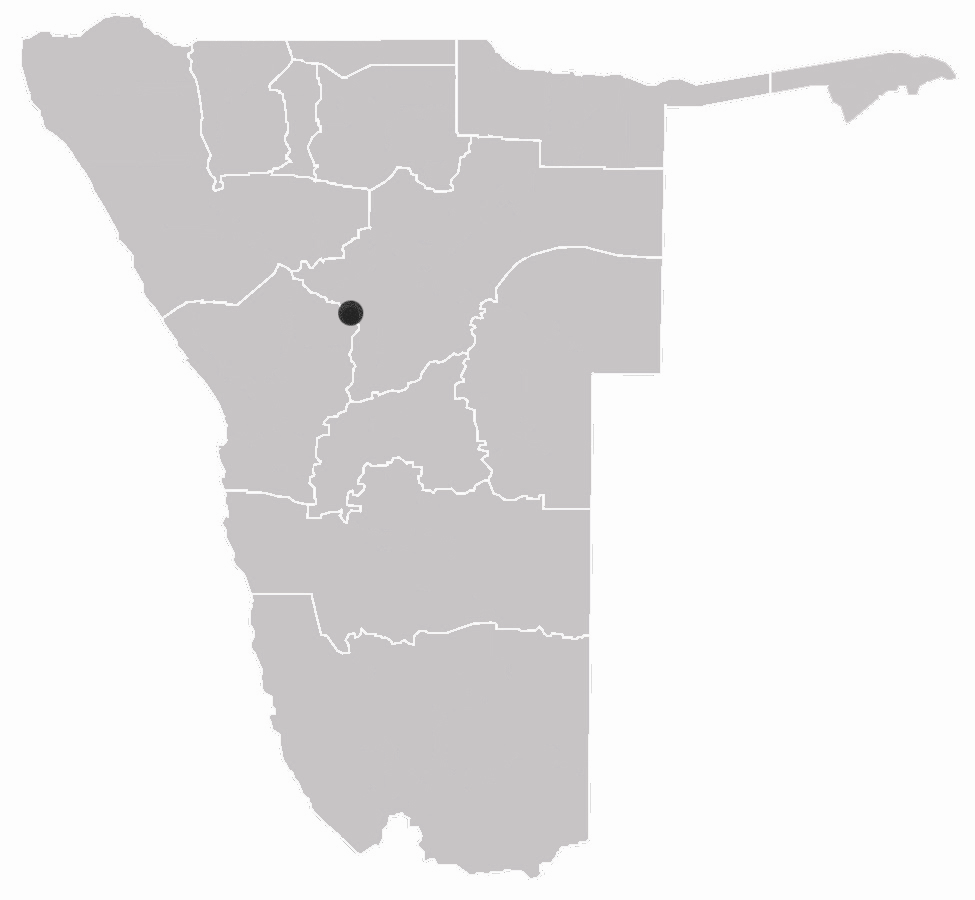
- Distribution of H. avasmontanus in Namibia

Species of flowering plant

Haemanthus avasmontanus Dinter is a South African bulbous geophyte in the genus Haemanthus. It is known from the type specimens only, which were collected by Kurt Dinter on 12 February 1923 from a single locality in the Auasberge near Tigerfontein on steep, south-facing, mica schist ledges, south-east of Windhoek in central Namibia. (Snijman, 1984). Despite thorough searches by a number of field botanists, no plants have been found since.

This species produces two erect, strap-shaped leaves annually, 350–400 x 40–45 mm, smooth and soft-textured. The flowerstalk is 250–350 mm long, with a brush-like flowerhead 45 mm in diameter; the acutely tipped spathe segments or valves are about as long as the flowers. Flowers 15–20, pure white; pedicels 7–10 mm long (Snijman, 1984).
