= Haemanthus namaquensis =

Scientific classification
- Kingdom: Plantae
- Clade: Tracheophytes
- Clade: Angiosperms
- Clade: Monocots
- Order: Asparagales
- Family: Amaryllidaceae
- Subfamily: Amaryllidoideae
- Genus: Haemanthus
- Species: H. namaquensis

Binomial name
- Haemanthus namaquensis R.A.Dyer (1940)

Species of flowering plant

Haemanthus namaquensis is a perennial flowering plant and geophyte that belongs to the genus Haemanthus and is part of the Succulent Karoo vegetation. The species is native to the Northern Cape and Namibia. It occurs from southern Namibia to Karkams in Namaqualand. There are eight subpopulations in an area of occurrence of 4000 km^{2}, the plant is considered rare.
