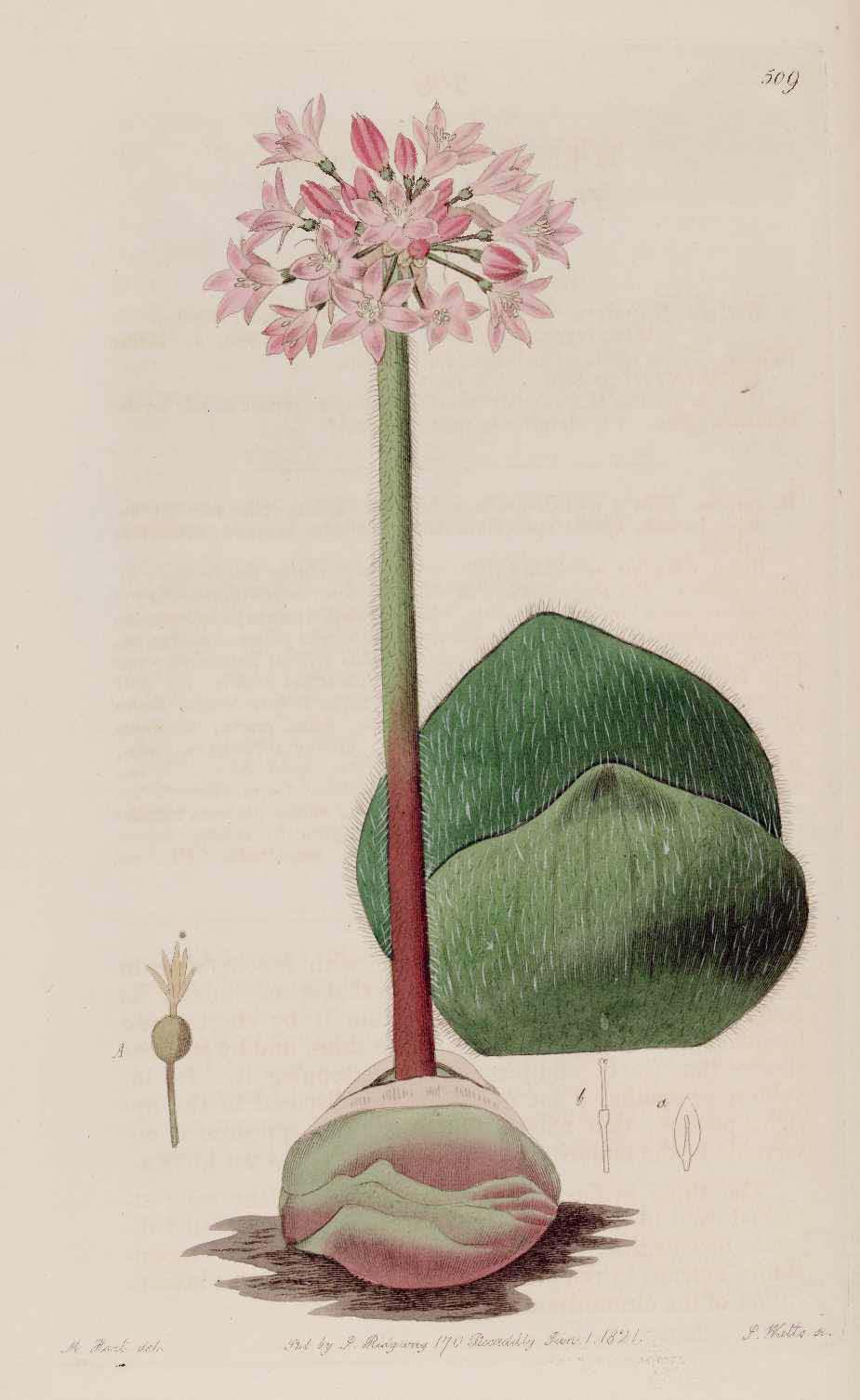
- Plate 509 from The Botanical Register

Scientific classification
- Kingdom: Plantae
- Clade: Tracheophytes
- Clade: Angiosperms
- Clade: Monocots
- Order: Asparagales
- Family: Amaryllidaceae
- Subfamily: Amaryllidoideae
- Genus: Haemanthus
- Species: H. carneus

Binomial name
- Haemanthus carneus Ker Gawl.
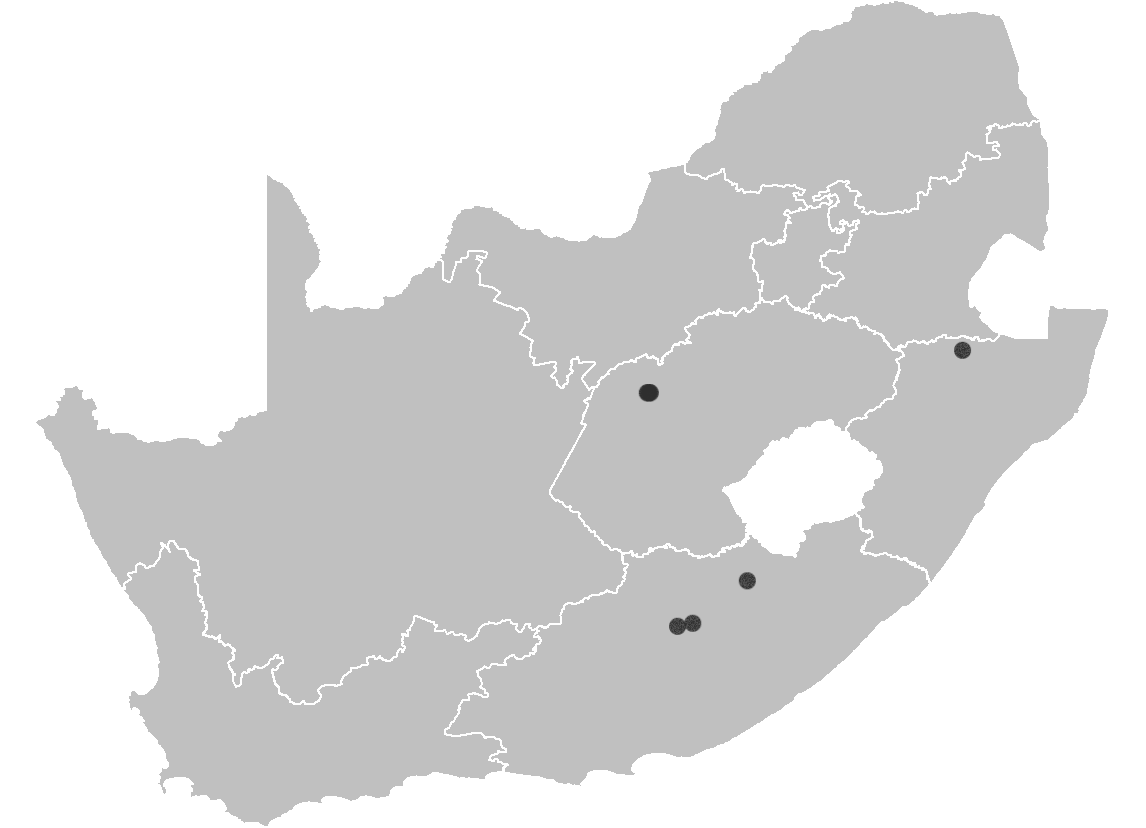
- Distribution over South Africa

Synonyms
- Haemanthus roseus Link; Melicho carneus (Ker Gawl.) Salisb. nom. inval.; Serena carnea (Ker Gawl.) Raf.

= Haemanthus carneus =

Species of flowering plant

Haemanthus carneus ('carneus': Latin 'flesh-coloured') is a South African bulbous geophyte in the genus Haemanthus. Despite a fairly wide distribution, it has been collected from only a few scattered sites in the Free State, KwaZulu-Natal and the Eastern Cape near Grahamstown and Somerset East, occurring between 300 m and 1200 m above sea level.

The bulbs grow in small clumps in the shelter of trees, bushes and rocks. Their tunics are more or less equal with horizontal leaf-scars. Leaves number two or three, usually flat on the ground, appearing with the flowers or following on soon. Peduncles show quite a variation in length from 100 to 200 mm long. H. carneus was first described in 1821 by the English botanist John Bellenden Ker Gawler (1764–1842), first editor of Edward's Botanical Register.
