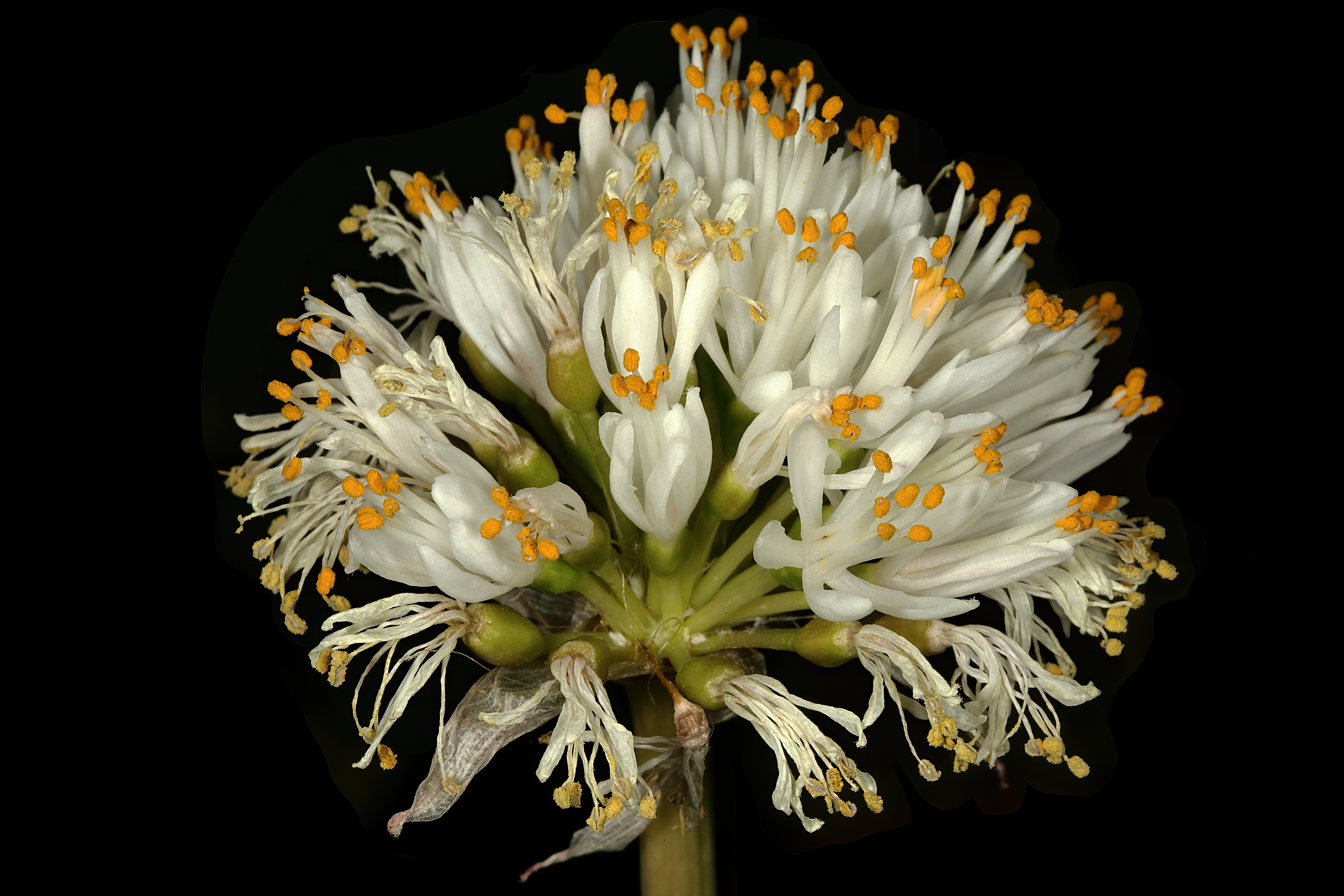

Scientific classification
- Kingdom: Plantae
- Clade: Tracheophytes
- Clade: Angiosperms
- Clade: Monocots
- Order: Asparagales
- Family: Amaryllidaceae
- Subfamily: Amaryllidoideae
- Genus: Haemanthus
- Species: H. montanus

Binomial name
- Haemanthus montanus Baker, (1896)

= Haemanthus montanus =

Species of flowering plant

Haemanthus montanus is a perennial flowering plant and geophyte belonging to the genus Haemanthus. The species are native to Gauteng, KwaZulu-Natal, Mpumalanga, North West, Eastern Cape and the Free State as well as Botswana.
