= Winsome Fanny Barker =

(1907–1994) South African botanist

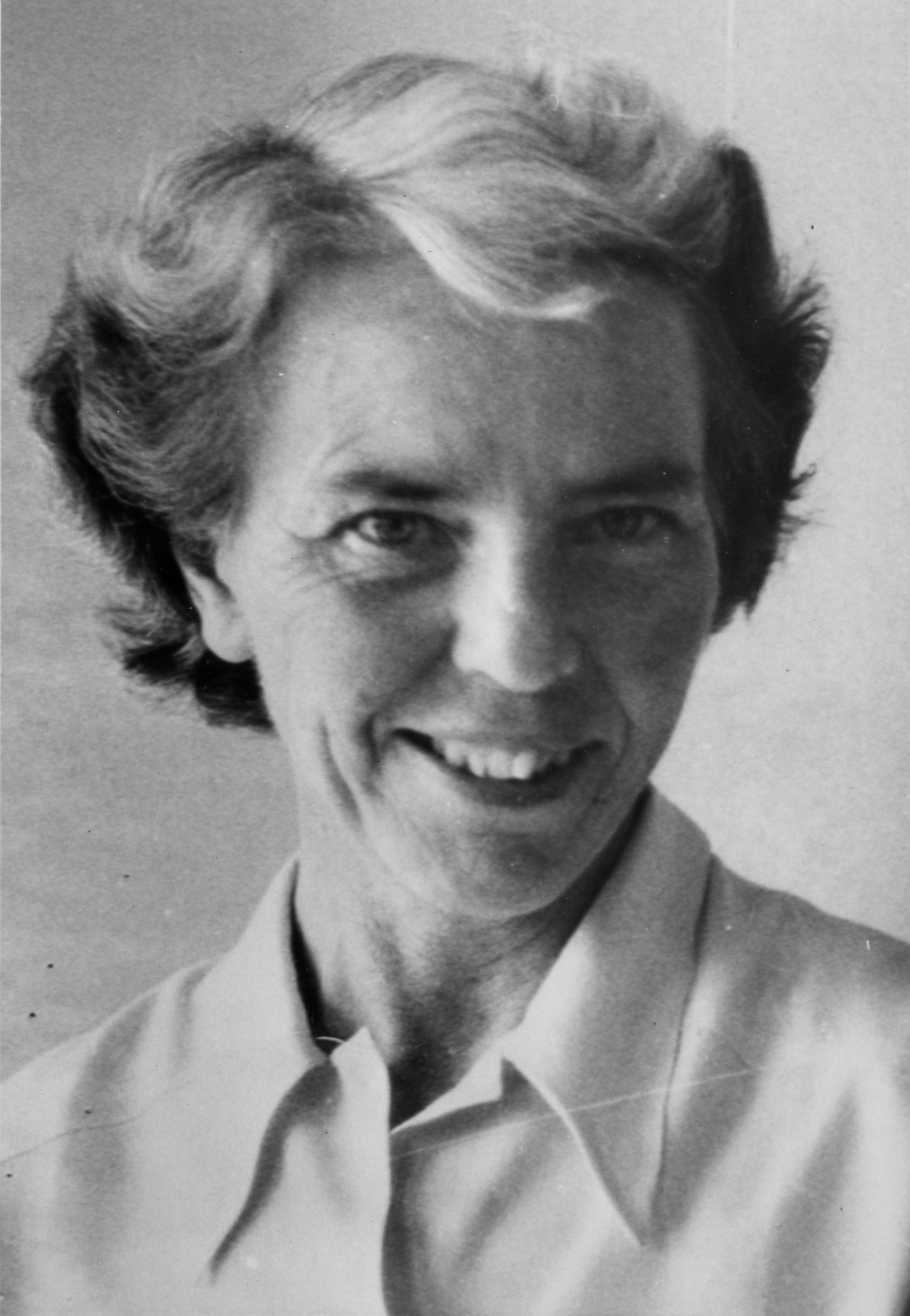
- Born: 23 September 1907; Jamestown, Cape Colony
- Died: 27 December 1994 (aged 87); Wynberg, Cape Town
- Other name: "Buddy"
- Education: Rhodes University College
- Known for: Establishing and curating the herbarium collection at Kirstenbosch
- Scientific career
- Fields: botany
- Workplaces: Kirstenbosch National Botanical Garden; Kew Gardens

Winsome Fanny Barker (23 September 1907 – 27 December 1994) was a South African botanist and plant collector noted for her work as Curator building the collection at the herbarium of the Kirstenbosch National Botanical Garden, as well as her research on Amaryllidaceae, Liliaceae and Haemodoraceae.

== Biography ==
Barker was born in Jamestown, Cape Colony to Joseph Barker (of Seaham, County Durham) and his wife Beatrice (née Cusens). The family moved to East London where she matriculated at East London Girls High School. Barker went on to complete a BSc in botany and zoology at Rhodes University College in 1928. The Suid-Afrikaanse Akademie vir Wetenskap en Kuns awarded her the Junior Captain Scott medals in both subjects as she had attained the highest marks in her class. She was offered a scholarship to complete a MSc in botany but declined in favour of the Edward Muspratt Solly Scholarship offered by the Kirstenbosch National Botanical Garden, starting in 1929.

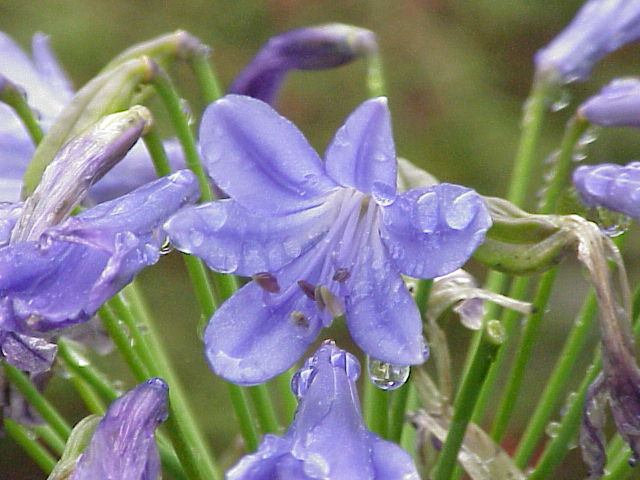
Agapanthus africanus

During the two years of her scholarship, Barker was supervised by H.M.L. Bolus in her studies including taxonomy, herbarium maintenance and fieldwork. She spent from February 1931 to July 1933 at Kew Gardens broadening her herbarium experience. She returned to Kirstenbosch in 1933 and was appointed Botanical Assistant to the Director working in the Bolus Herbarium, until it was agreed to relocate it to the University of Cape Town in 1934 (the relocation only happened in 1938). In 1935 Barker began to accumulate specimens for an independent herbarium for Kirstenbosch, although the trustees of the National Botanic Gardens only officially resolved to create the herbarium four years later in 1939 after the Bolus herbarium had moved. The first annual budget of the herbarium was £350 for salaries and equipment. Barker was appointed as head of the herbarium in 1940. By the time she retired the herbarium contained more than 110000 specimen sheets, every one of which she had personally scrutinised.

In 1956 the South African Museum herbarium, containing 100000 specimen sheets, was transferred to Kirstenbosch on permanent loan. In doing so the SA Museum herbarium curator, Dr Joyce Lewis and her assistant also transferred to Kirstenbosch. To accommodate them, Lewis was appointed Research Officer while Barker was appointed Curator, a position she held until her retirement in 1972.

Barker was also an accomplished botanical illustrator. Thirty-five of her illustrations were published in Flowering Plants of South Africa between 1930 and 1938, and the Royal Horticultural Society in London had a set of her watercolour images of Agapanthus. The Compton Herbarium at Kirstenbosch held 107 colour images of Lachenalia painted by Barker between 1930 and 1950.

Barker was also involved in the training of the Edward Muspratt Solly Scholars.

== Eponyms ==
Barker is commemorated in the names of several South African plants, including Leucadendron barkerae I. Williams, Haemanthus barkerae Snijman, Lachenalia barkeriana U. Mull.-Doblies, and Romulea barkerae M.P. de Vos. She described at least 50 species.

Acrostemon barkerae Compton, Conophytum barkerae L. Bolus and Othonna barkerae Compton are named in her honour.
