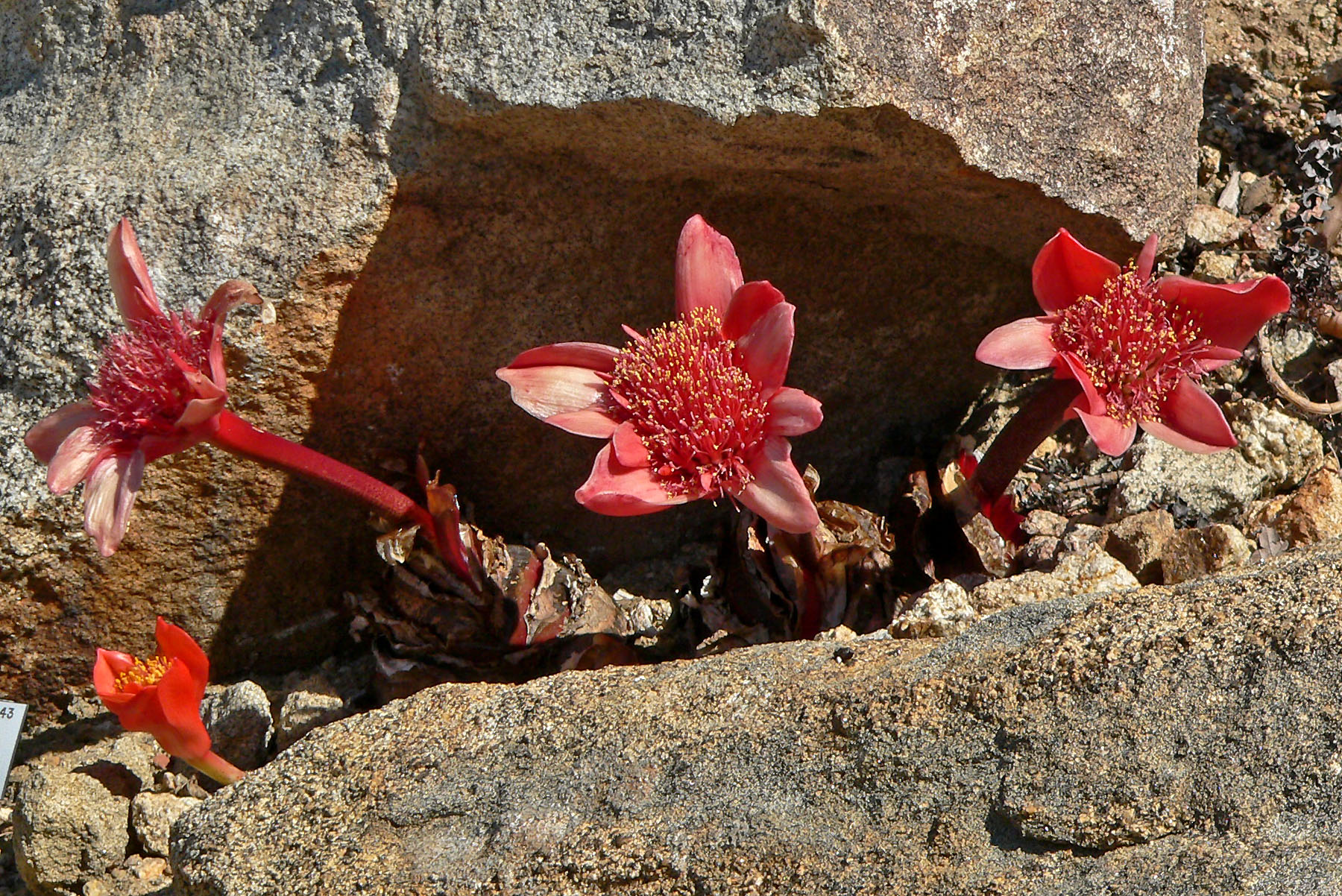
- Haemanthus coccineus

Scientific classification
- Kingdom: Plantae
- Clade: Tracheophytes
- Clade: Angiosperms
- Clade: Monocots
- Order: Asparagales
- Family: Amaryllidaceae
- Subfamily: Amaryllidoideae
- Tribe: Haemantheae
- Genus: Haemanthus; L.

Type species
- Haemanthus coccineus L.

Species
- See text

= Haemanthus =

Genus of flowering plants

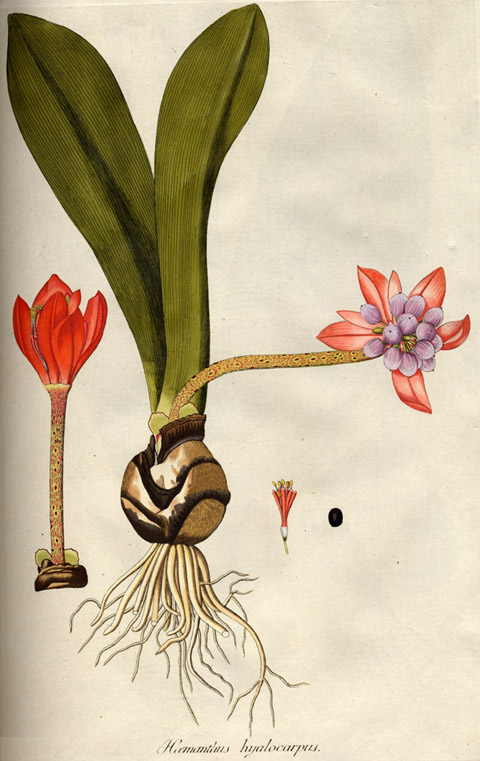
Haemanthus coccineus L. Nikolaus Joseph von Jacquin 1798

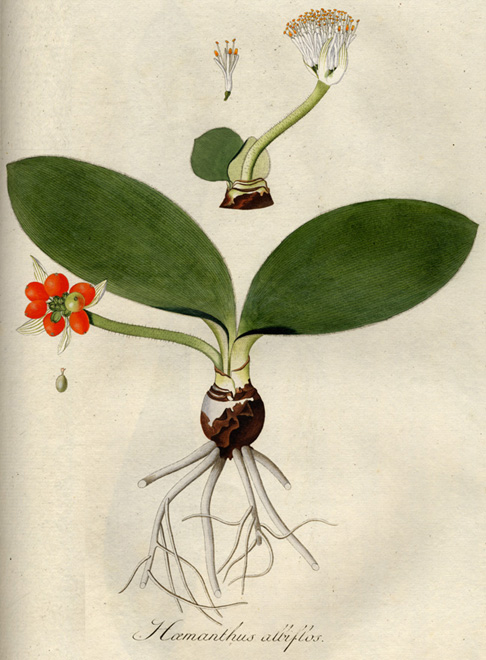
Haemanthus albiflos Jacq. Nikolaus Joseph von Jacquin 1798

Haemanthus is a southern African genus of flowering plants in the family Amaryllidaceae, subfamily Amaryllidoideae. Members of the genus are known as blood lily and paintbrush lily. A total of 24 species are currently accepted by the Plants of the World Online (POWO) database, native to South Africa, Botswana, Namibia, Lesotho and Eswatini. About 15 species occur in the winter rainfall region of Namaqualand and the Western Cape, the remainder being found in the summer rainfall region, with one species Haemanthus albiflos occurring in both regions.

== Description ==
Most of the species have brush-like flowerheads enclosed in four or more membranous to fleshy spathe bracts which usually match the flower colour and, like sepals, protect the flowerheads from damage and desiccation. The flowers produce abundant nectar and pollen and a faint smell unattractive to humans. Fruits are mostly globose and when ripe, range through bright red, to pink, orange and white, and are usually aromatic. Three of the species, H. albiflos, H. deformis and H. pauculifolius are evergreen; these three species have bulbs that are only partly buried, the exposed section often turning bright green. The winter rainfall region's bulbs on the other hand are mostly from arid habitats and are found fairly deep below the surface, usually flowering before producing leaves. The genus produces relatively large bulbs that act as food and water storage organs, and consist of fleshy leafbases or tunics that may be arranged in two obvious ranks - termed a distichous arrangement. The morphology of the bulbs is useful in taxonomy and identification.

Haemanthus have from one to six leaves, ranging from broad, leathery and prostrate to narrow, crisped or succulent and erect, with a variety of surface textures from smooth to extremely hairy or even sticky. A few species such as H. unifoliatus and H. nortieri, usually produce only a single erect, broad leaf. H. coccineus and H. sanguineus were two of the first species in this genus to be described and because of their reddish flowers, gave rise to the generic name, being Greek for 'blood flower'. Haemanthus is found from Namibia through Namaqualand to the Western Cape and then through the Southern Cape to the Eastern Cape as far north as KwaZulu-Natal and the Transvaal. Haemanthus species are extremely variable in their habitat requirements, from coastal dunes to mountain tops, rocky ledges to seasonally-inundated gravel plains and bogs. Some species, such as H. canaliculatus, are to some extent fire-dependent in that they need occasional burning of their fynbos habitat to clear undergrowth in order to flower.

== Taxonomy ==
The genus Haemanthus was created in 1753 by Linnaeus. The name is derived from Greek words αίμα, haima and ανθος, anthos, meaning "blood flower". In 1838 the botanist Constantine Samuel Rafinesque placed H. pubescens in a new genus Leucodesmis, H. coccineus in Perihema, and H. carneus in Serena. The English botanist Richard Anthony Salisbury (1761–1829) in his 1866 posthumous publication 'Genera of Plants', placed H. amarylloides under Melicho and H. albiflos under Diacles.

The genus was illustrated in Nikolaus Joseph von Jacquin's description of the rarities in the glasshouses of Schönbrunn, Plantarum Rariorum Horti Caesarei Schoenbrunnensis Descriptiones Et Icones (1797–98). The first thorough taxonomic treatment of the genus was by Baker in 1896 and published in Flora Capensis. Nothing further was done until 1976 when Friis & Nordal published a brief review recognising only 6 species and reinstating Scadoxus. Dierdré Snijman's work published in 1984, described 21 distinct species, with H. pauculifolius, occurring only on the Transvaal Drakensberg Escarpment, later being added.

=== Species ===
A list of all the species accepted by POWO as of August 2026 is given below. Some species formerly included in Haemanthus have been transferred to a number of genera, including Scadoxus; for example, Haemanthus grandiflorus is now Scadoxus multiflorus.

Image	Scientific name	Distribution
	Haemanthus albiflos Jacq.	southern Cape through the Eastern Cape to KwaZulu-Natal
	Haemanthus amarylloides Jacq.	between Springbok and Grootvlei in Namaqualand, and along the Bokkeveld Mountains escarpment to Gifberg near Vanrhynsdorp.
	Haemanthus avasmontanus Dinter	south-east of Windhoek in central Namibia.
	Haemanthus barkerae Snijman	Western Cape from the Bokkeveld Mountains near Nieuwoudtville and the foothills of the Roggeveld Mountains, to the Hantamsberg near Calvinia, and bounded to the north and south by Loeriesfontein and the Tanqua Karoo.
	Haemanthus canaliculatus Levyns	Western Cape between Betty's Bay and Rooiels
	Haemanthus carneus Ker Gawler	the Orange Free State, KwaZulu-Natal and the Eastern Cape near Grahamstown and Somerset East
	Haemanthus coccineus L.	Namibia, to South Africa in the Cape Peninsula, to the Keiskamma River in the Eastern Cape
	Haemanthus crispus Snijman	Namaqualand
	Haemanthus dasyphyllus Snijman	Loeriesfontein in Namaqualand.
	Haemanthus deformis Hook.f.	KwaZulu-Natal
	Haemanthus graniticus Snijman	Namaqualand
	Haemanthus humanii G.D.Duncan	Western Cape
	Haemanthus humilis Jacq.	western Transvaal, Orange Free State, northern and eastern Cape.
	Haemanthus lanceifolius Jacq.	Namaqualand
	Haemanthus montanus Baker	eastern region of South Africa
	Haemanthus namaquensis R.A. Dyer	Namaqualand
	Haemanthus nortieri Isaac	north of Clanwilliam
	Haemanthus pauculifolius Snijman & A.E.van Wyk	Eswatini and from the Middle Pongolo River Reservoir as well as Blyderivierspoort to Pigg's Peak in KwaZulu-Natal and Mpumalanga.
	Haemanthus pubescens L.	southern Namibia and Namaqualand
	Haemanthus pumilio Jacq.	Western Cape
	Haemanthus sanguineus Jacq.	Western Cape.
	Haemanthus snijmaniae Mart.-Azorín, M.Pinter, M.B.Crespo, M.Á.Alonso & J.L.Villar	Northern Cape
	Haemanthus tristis Snijman	southeast Tanqua Karoo
	Haemanthus unifoliatus Snijman	Cape Province, Namaqualand

== Cultivation ==
Haemanthus species do best in large, well-drained containers or planted out in a rockery. Depending on species, they should have full sun or partial shade - winter rainfall species preferring full sun, while summer rainfall and evergreen species need partial shade. Most species are extremely tolerant of poor soil, but should not be disturbed if they are to flower. Propagation can be by offsets (adventitious bulblets), leaf cuttings and by germination of seed. Seeds when ripe are generally surrounded by a sticky pulp, producing long silken threads which presumably are useful in anchoring the seed when germinating and in the early stages of growth.

== See also ==
- List of plants known as lily
