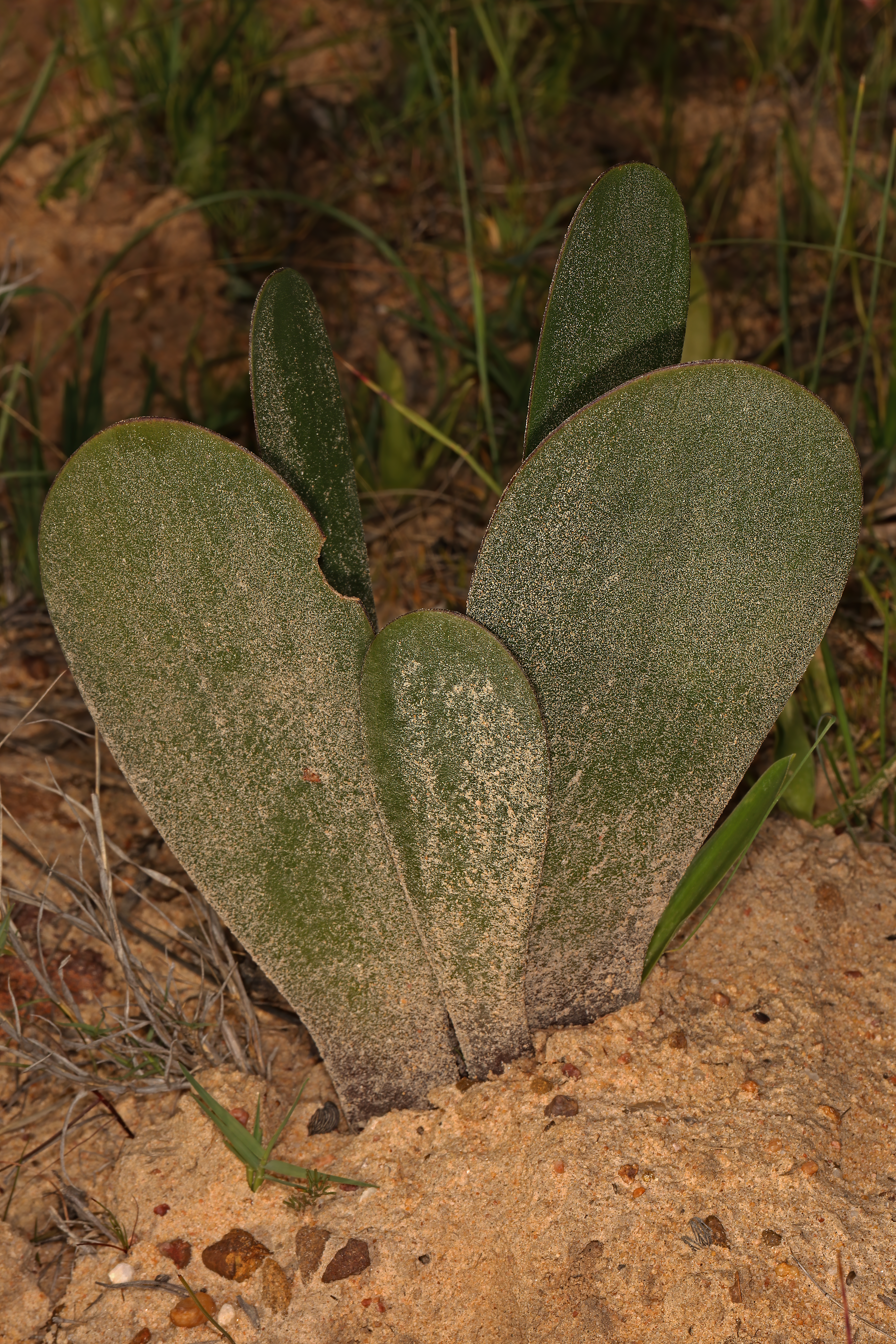

Scientific classification
- Kingdom: Plantae
- Clade: Tracheophytes
- Clade: Angiosperms
- Clade: Monocots
- Order: Asparagales
- Family: Amaryllidaceae
- Subfamily: Amaryllidoideae
- Genus: Haemanthus
- Species: H. nortieri

Binomial name
- Haemanthus nortieri Isaac (1937)

= Haemanthus nortieri =

Species of flowering plant

Haemanthus nortieri is a perennial flowering plant and geophyte belonging to the genus Haemanthus. The species are endemic to the Western Cape and occur on the Nardouwberg. The plant has an area of occurrence smaller than 100 km² and there are three subpopulations. It is threatened by overgrazing and trampling by livestock, road construction, invasive plants and illegal collection by horticulturists.
