= Pauline Lesley Perry =

South African botanist (1927–2015)

- Born: 13 August 1927; London, England
- Died: 26 December 2015 (aged 88); Wales
- Education: Wye College, University of London
- Scientific career
- Fields: Botany
- Institutions: Kirstenbosch National Botanical Garden
- Author abbrev. (botany): P.L.Perry

Pauline Lesley Perry (13 August 1927 – 26 December 2015) was a British-South African botanist, horticulturalist and plant collector.

== Early life and education ==
Pauline Lesley Perry studied at Wye College, University of London in 1946–1949, graduating Bachelor of Sciences, and then taught biology in the United Kingdom before coming to South Africa in 1972.

== Career ==
From 1976 Perry worked with the National Botanic Gardens of South Africa, stationed at the Karoo Botanic Granden, Worcester, specializing in geophytes from the winter rainfall region of the Cape, especially Namaqualand. She and Dierdre Anne Snijman made many field trips in this region. In 1984, Perry started collecting plants, especially spermatophytes. She published 85 names of plants.

Pauline Lesley Perry retired in 1989. After retirement, she continued publishing scientific articles and books, such as A vegetation survey of the Karoo National Botanic Garden Reserve, Worcester (1990), Growing Geophytes at the Karoo Gardens (1991), A revision of the genus Eriospermum (Eriospermaceae) (1994), and Bulbinella in South Africa (1999) based on the part of a M.Sc. thesis submitted to the Botany Department of the University of Cape Town.

Generic plants’ name perryae honors Perry.

== Later life and death ==
Perry retired to Wales. She died there on 26 December 2015, at the age of 88.

== Works ==
- A floristic analysis of the Nieuwoudtville Wild Flower Reserve north-western Cape. By Deirdre A. Snijman and Pauline L. Perry, 1987
- A vegetation survey of the Karoo National Botanic Garden Reserve, Worcester. By Jennifer Smitheman and Pauline Perry, 1990
- Bulbinella - a Neglected Garden Plant? Veld & Flora, 1990
- Growing Geophytes at the Karoo Gardens (1991)
- A revision of the genus Eriospermum (Eriospermaceae). By Deirdre A. Snijman and Pauline L. Perry, 1994
- Bylbinella in South Africa, 1999

== Eponyms ==
- Bokkeveldia perryae (Snijman) D.Müll.-Doblies & U.Müll.-Doblies
- Strumaria perryae Snijman
- Lachenalia perryae G.D.Duncan
