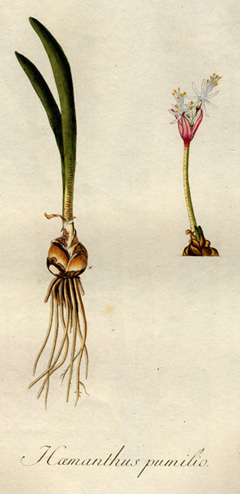

Scientific classification
- Kingdom: Plantae
- Clade: Tracheophytes
- Clade: Angiosperms
- Clade: Monocots
- Order: Asparagales
- Family: Amaryllidaceae
- Subfamily: Amaryllidoideae
- Genus: Haemanthus
- Species: H. pumilio

Binomial name
- Haemanthus pumilio Jacq. (1797)

Synonyms
- Melicho pumilio (Jacq.) Salisb.

= Haemanthus pumilio =

Species of flowering plant

Haemanthus pumilio is a perennial flowering plant and geophyte that belongs to the genus Haemanthus and is part of the fynbos and Renosterveld. The species are endemic to the Western Cape and occur at Stellenbosch. The plant has lost 60% of its habitat in the last 90 years with at least 20% occurring in the last 60 years due to crop cultivation and development. There are currently two subpopulations left consisting of approximately 2000 plants. These plants are threatened by illegal collection by horticulturists, uncontrolled fires and destruction by locusts and rodents.
