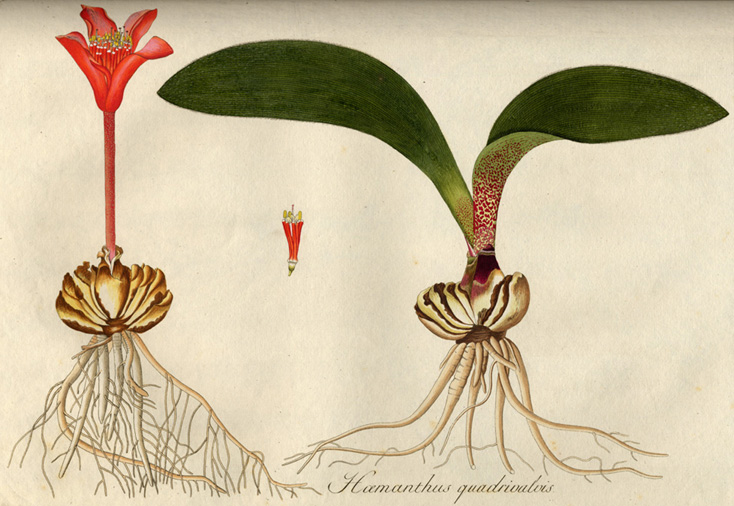
- Haemanthus pubescens by Nikolaus Joseph von Jacquin 1798.

Scientific classification
- Kingdom: Plantae
- Clade: Tracheophytes
- Clade: Angiosperms
- Clade: Monocots
- Order: Asparagales
- Family: Amaryllidaceae
- Subfamily: Amaryllidoideae
- Genus: Haemanthus
- Species: H. pubescens

Binomial name
- Haemanthus pubescens L.f.
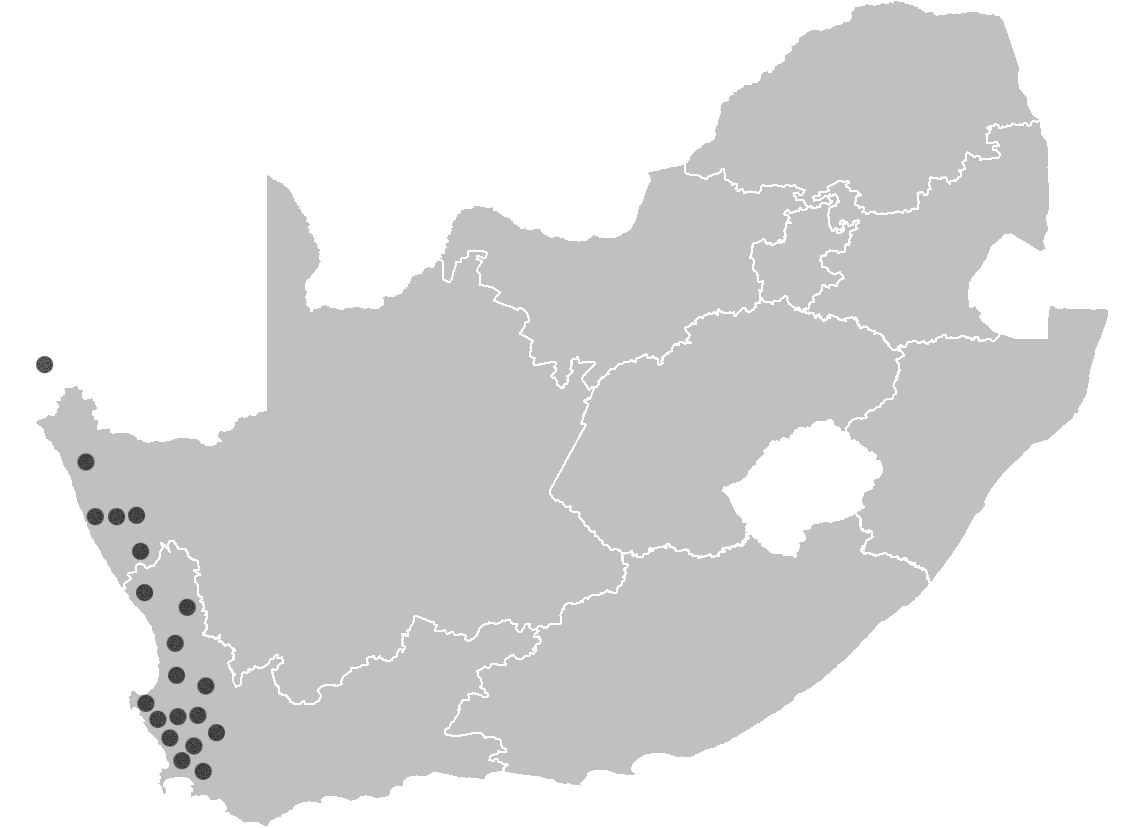
- ● occurrence records

Synonyms
- Haemanthus angustifolius Salisb.; Haemanthus quadrivalvis Jacq.; Haemanthus trispathinus M.Roem.; Leucodesmis pubescens (L.f.) Raf.

= Haemanthus pubescens =

Species of flowering plant

Haemanthus pubescens ('pubescens': Latin 'having a soft downy covering') is an endemic South African bulbous geophyte in the genus Haemanthus.

The plant was first described by Linnaeus the Younger in 1782, 29 years after his father's description of H. coccineus. Both species are common along the West Coast and it is puzzling that H. pubescens was not collected and described much earlier. The genus Haemanthus was created in 1753 by Linnaeus. In 1838, Constantine Samuel Rafinesque placed H. pubescens in a new genus Leucodesmis, H. coccineus in Perihema, and H. carneus in Serena. The English botanist Richard Anthony Salisbury (1761-1829) in his 1866 posthumous publication 'Genera of Plants', placed H. amarylloides under Melicho and H. albiflos under Diacles.

H. pubescens occurs at elevations up to 300 m from Cape Town northwards along the coast to southern Namibia. Formerly it was known only from the south western Cape, but collections from north of the Olifants River into Namibia, led to a revision of its geographic limits. The 4-7 large, fleshy spathe valves are diagnostic of the species. The two leaves are broad, flat on the ground and usually pubescent. Bulbs are deep, with fleshy distichous tunics.
