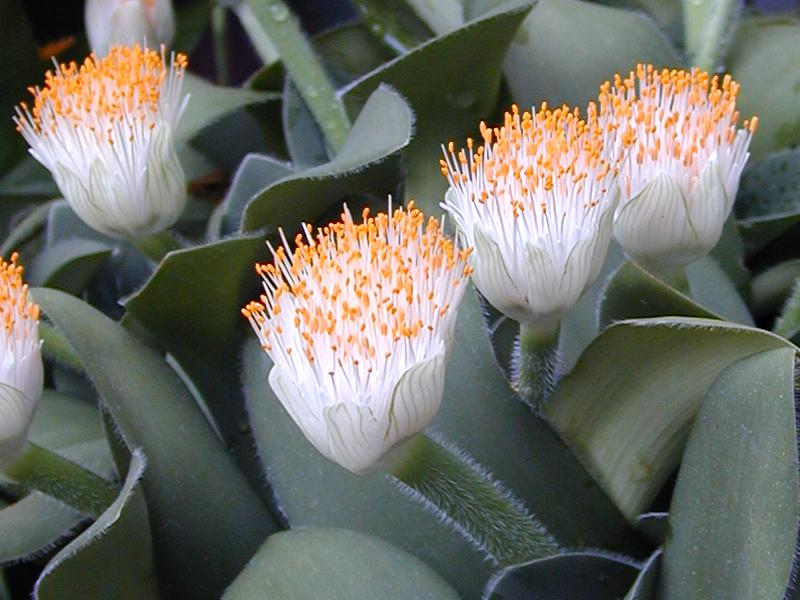

Scientific classification
- Kingdom: Plantae
- Clade: Tracheophytes
- Clade: Angiosperms
- Clade: Monocots
- Order: Asparagales
- Family: Amaryllidaceae
- Subfamily: Amaryllidoideae
- Genus: Haemanthus
- Species: H. albiflos

Binomial name
- Haemanthus albiflos Jacq.
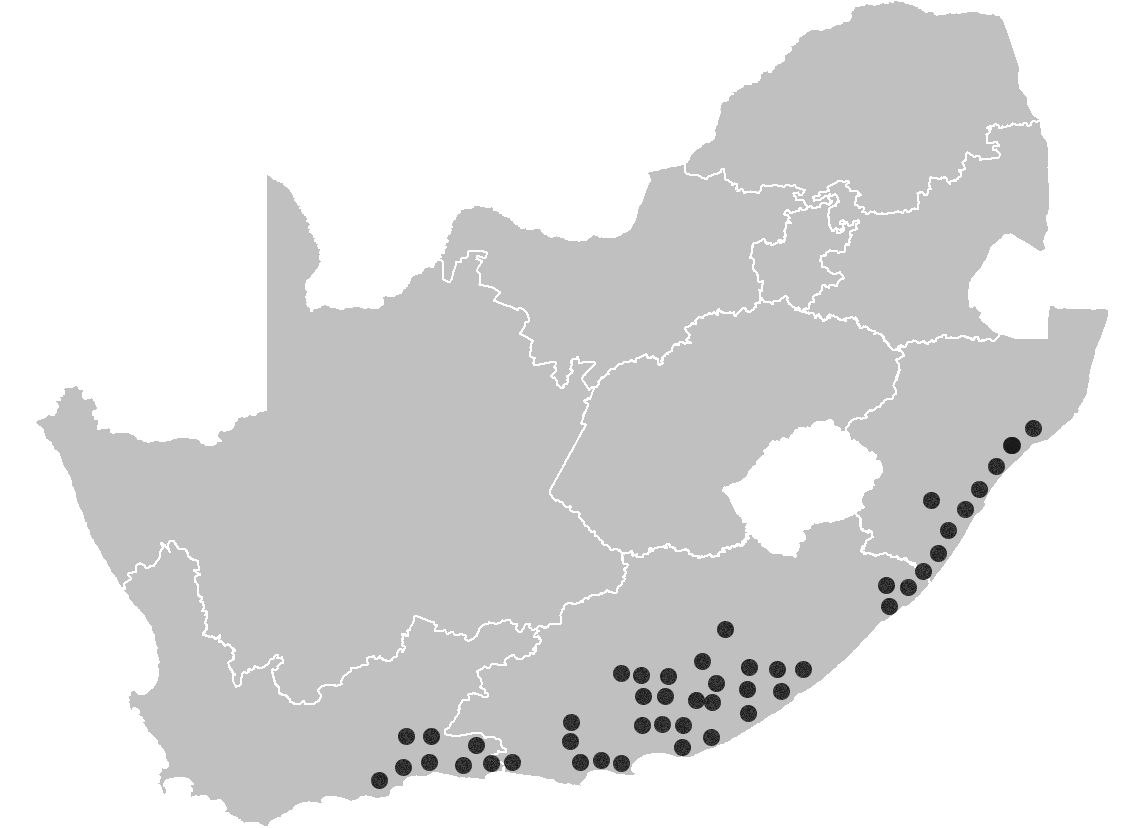
- Distribution of H. albiflos in South Africa

Synonyms
- Diacles ciliaris Salisb. nom. inval.; Diacles pubescens (Herb.) Salisb. nom. inval.; Haemanthus albomaculatus Baker; Haemanthus intermedius (Herb.) M.Roem.; Haemanthus leucanthus Miq.; Haemanthus pubescens (Herb.) Ker Gawl. nom. illeg.; Haemanthus virescens Herb.

= Haemanthus albiflos =

Paintbrush or elephant's tongue

Species of flowering plant

Haemanthus albiflos is a species of flowering plant in the family Amaryllidaceae, native to the coast and mountains of South Africa. It is sometimes given the English name paintbrush, not to be confused with Castilleja species which also have this name. It is an evergreen bulbous perennial geophyte, prized horticulturally for its unusual appearance and extreme tolerance of neglect. H. albiflos is the only Haemanthus species found in both winter and summer rainfall regions, and has a mainly coastal distribution from the southern Cape through the Eastern Cape to KwaZulu-Natal, showing a preference for cool, shady spots.

== Etymology ==
The specific epithet albiflos means "white flower" in English. As a pot plant it has been called "elephant's tongue" and "elephant ear" - for its leaves - or "shaving-brush (or paintbrush) plant" - for its flowers.

== Description ==
The upper half of the bulb is usually exposed and bright green. Since it produces a pair of leaves once a year and is evergreen, the plant may have up to three pairs of leaves. The leaves are up to 40 cm (16 in) long, and may have a covering of short, soft hairs, and occasionally yellow spots on the upper surface. In late autumn and winter, brush-like umbels comprising multiple tiny white florets are borne on stout stems, followed by fleshy red oval fruits which have white seeds. The whole plant grows to 20–30 cm (8–12 in) tall by 15 cm (6 in) wide.

== Cultivation ==
H. albiflos is hardy down to about 1 °C (34 °F) but does not survive prolonged freezing temperatures. This is a very successful indoor plant where it is too tender to be grown outdoors, and thrives on "healthy neglect". It prefers not to be in full sun, but is very tolerant of under-watering, and flowers better if restricted in a small pot.

This plant has gained the Royal Horticultural Society's Award of Garden Merit.

== Propagation ==
It reproduces readily by adventitious buds or offsets, which may be removed when the flowering period is over. Offsets can be separated carefully from the parent plant to be grown on, preferably when they are fairly well developed, and ensuring that there is some root on them. Fruits are only occasionally produced indoors, presumably for lack of pollinating insects, but when one does produce a seed, this can be sown, and should grow, though it is a slower process. With very little care, this plant can be propagated for many years.

== Gallery ==
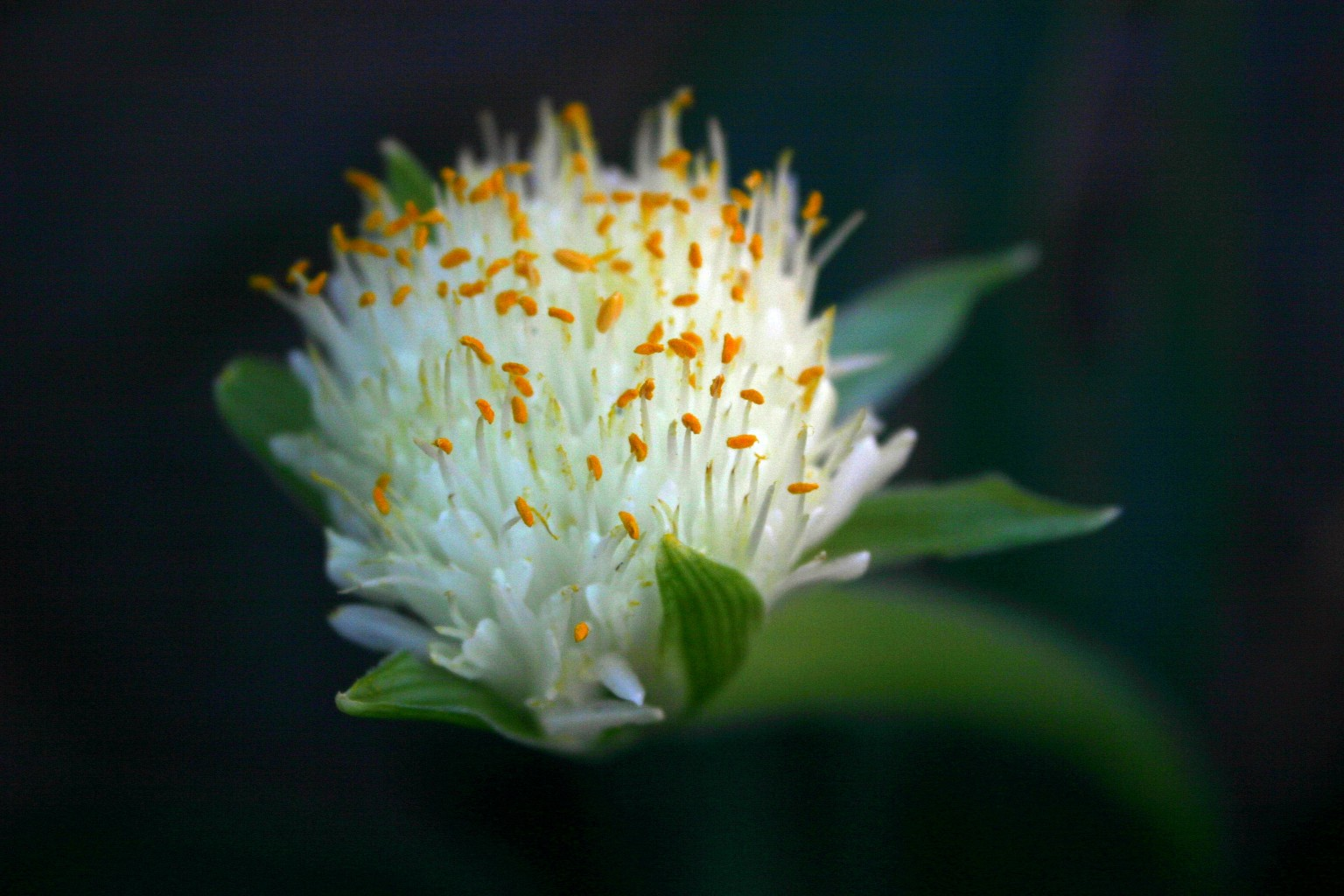
Flowerhead

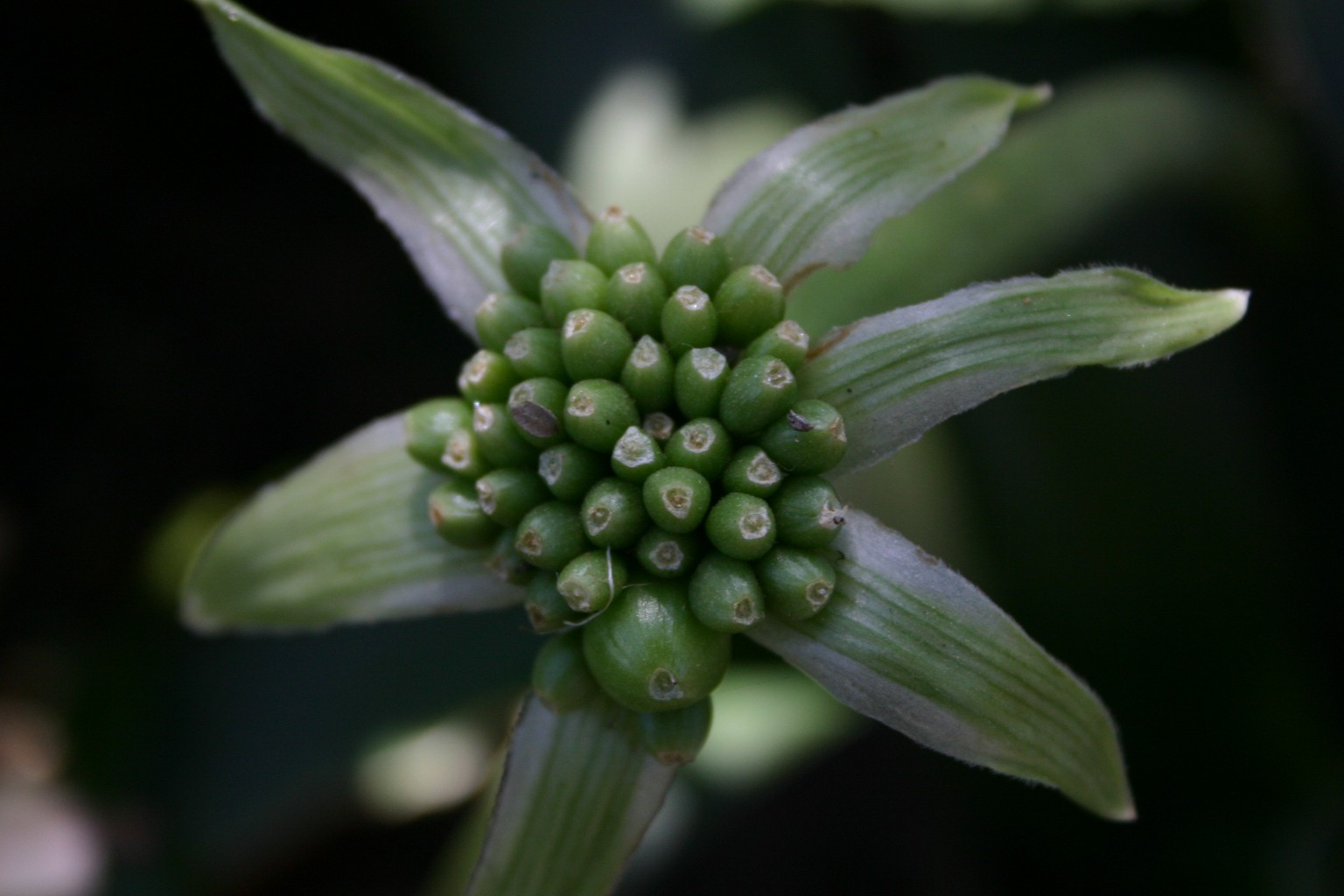
Immature fruiting head

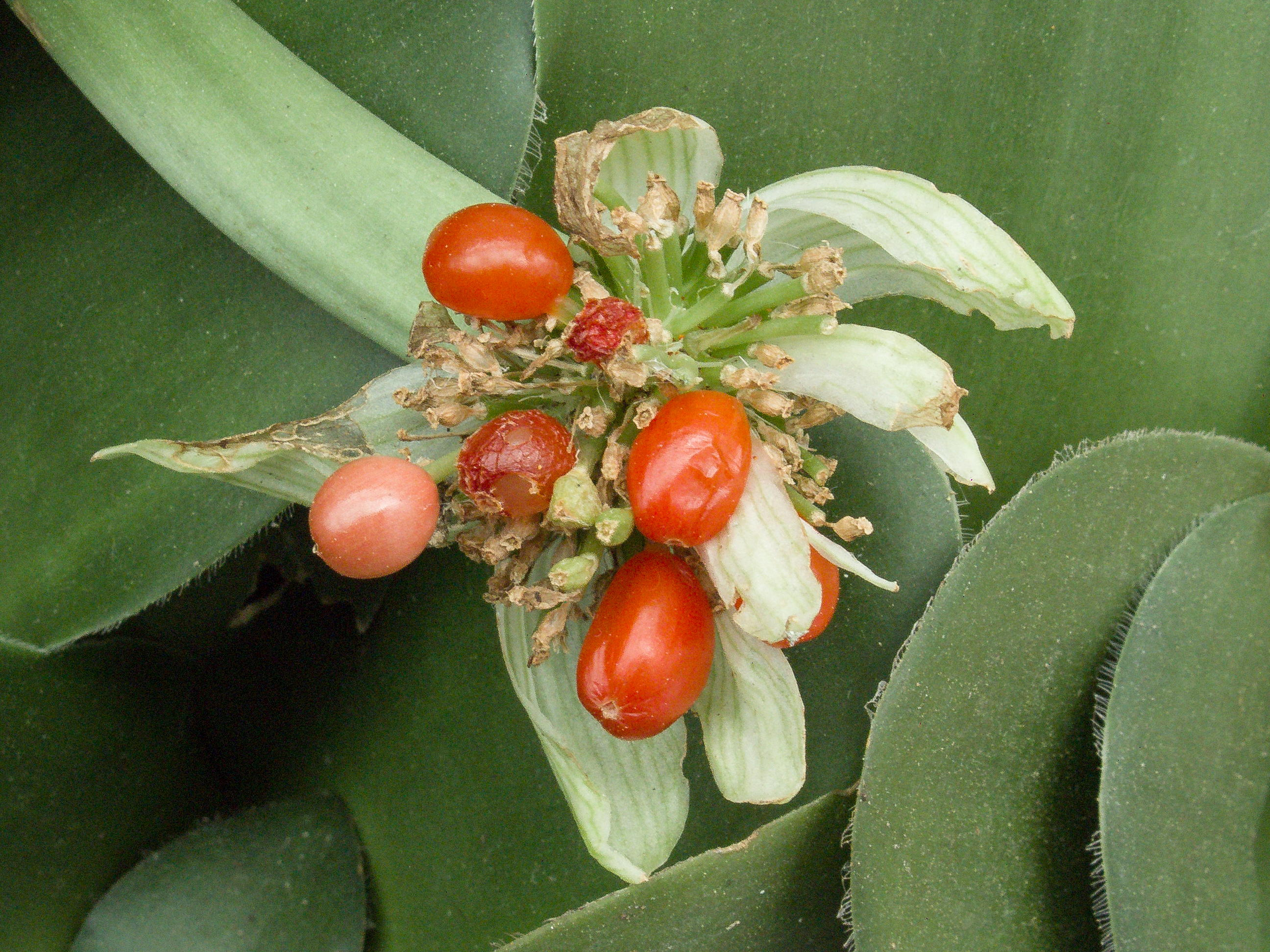
Mature fruits

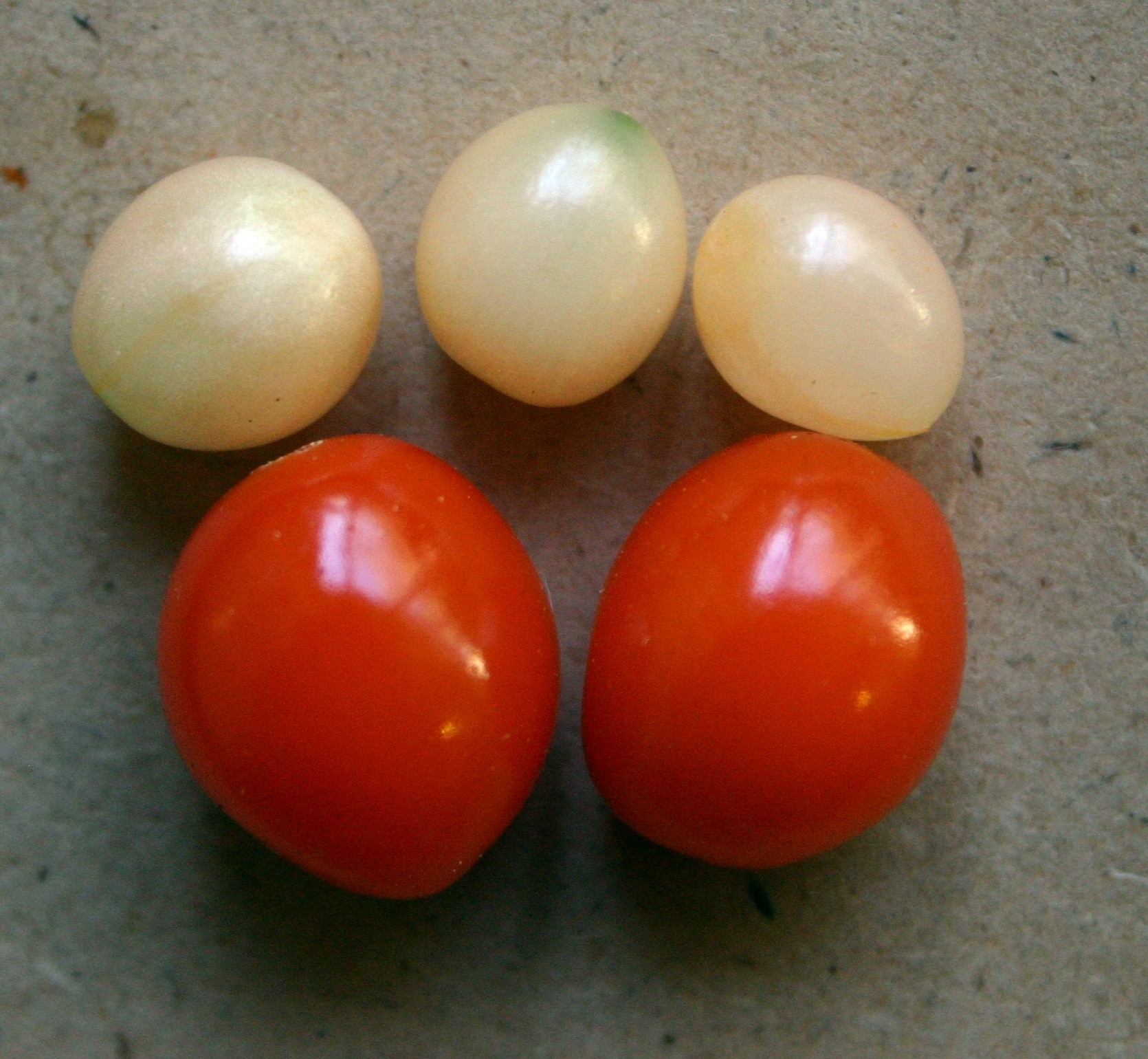
Fruits and seeds
