= Dierdré A. Snijman =

South African botanist

Dierdré Anne Snijman
- Born: Johannesburg
- Other names: Dee Snijman
- Education: Blessed Imelda Convent, Brakpan; Damelin College, Johannesburg; University of Natal
- Alma mater: University of Cape Town
- Known for: Taxonomy of Amaryllis
- Spouse: Colin Paterson Jones
- Scientific career
- Fields: Botany
- Institutions: Kirstenbosch National Botanical Garden
- Doctoral advisor: Peter Linder

Dierdré "Dee" Anne Snijman is a South African botanist and plant taxonomist who is notable for studying and writing extensively on bulbs. She has described over 120 species and has written comprehensive works on South African flora. She received the 1997 Herbert Medal from the International Bulb Society for her research on Amaryllis.

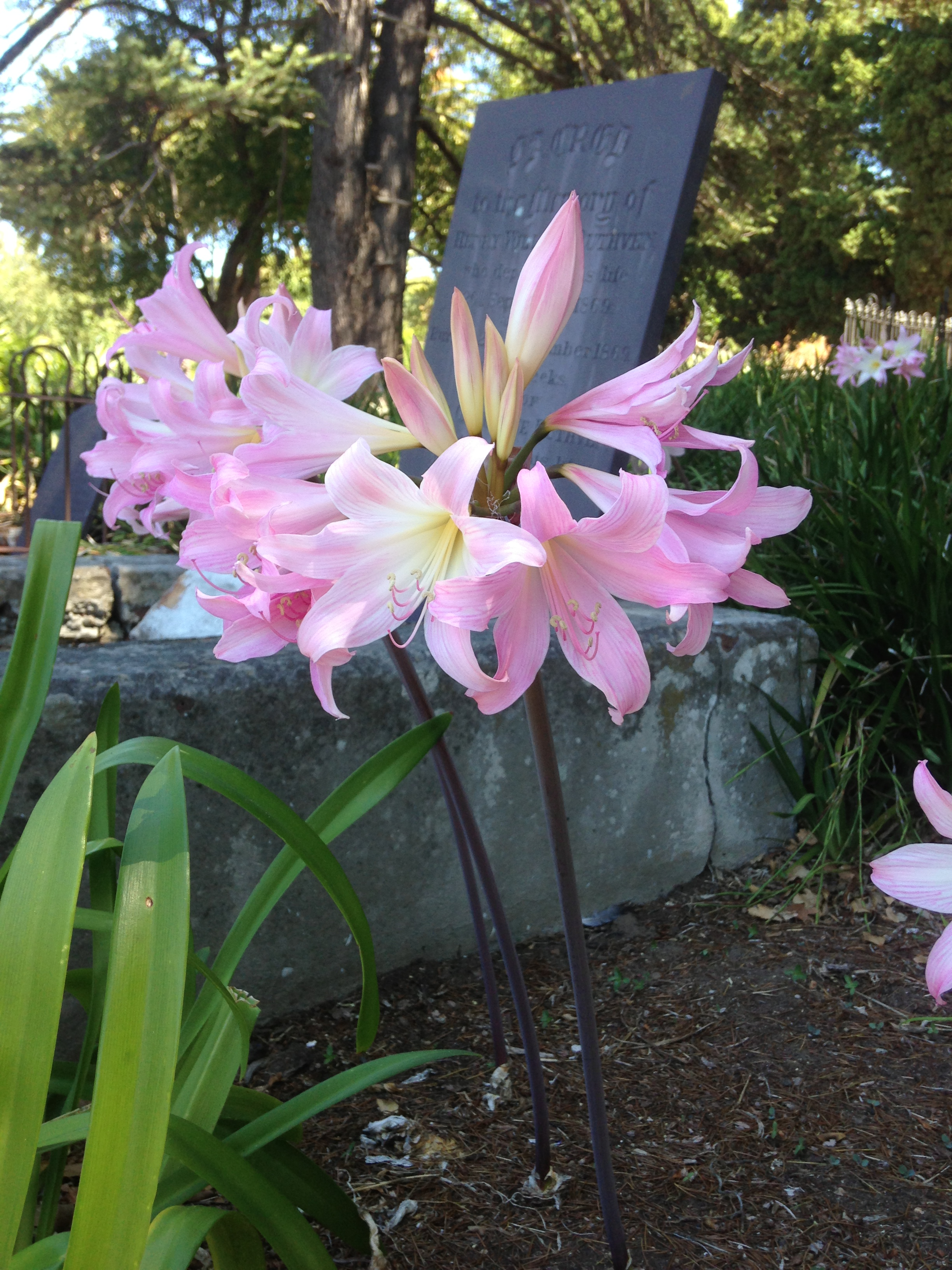
Amaryllis belladonna

== Early life and career ==
Snijman was born in a small town east of Johannesburg, South Africa and early on adopted the name "Dee" as easier to spell and pronounce. She was educated at Blessed Imelda Convent in Brakpan and at Damelin College in Johannesburg. Her initial interest in South African flowers was sparked by her parents' garden and the illustrations by Cythna Letty and Aruiol Batten. She completed her BSc (Botany and Mathematics) at the University of Natal. She obtained her MSc in 1973 and at the same time a Diploma in Education. Teaching proved to be not to her liking as proven by "a year of teaching unruly children."

In 1974 she joined the Compton herbarium at the Kirstenbosch Botanical Gardens where she encountered the work of several South African botanists, including Robert Harold Compton. W.F. Barker had completed a collection of monocots there prior to her retirement. Peter Goldblatt and John Rourke guided her early work. She and Pauline Perry made many field trips in the Southern African winter-rainfall region.

In 1984 she published the Genus Haemanthus in conjunction with the botanical artist Ellaphie Ward-Hilhorst, and this was followed work on Hessea and Strumaria, which formed part of her Ph.D. degree.

== Works ==
- Snijman, D.A. (2013). Plants of the Greater Cape Floristic Region. SANBI. ISBN 9781919976778. OCLC 874805573.
- Snijman, D.A. (2013). Plants of the Greater Cape Floristic Region. 2, The extra Cape flora. South African National Biodiversity Institute, SANBI. ISBN 9781919976778. OCLC 1017436885.
- Snijman, D.A. (1984). Revision of the Genus Haemanthus L. (Amaryllidaceae). National Botanic Gardens of South Africa. OCLC 623237158.
- Snijman, D.A. (2014). A taxonomic revision of the genus Pauridia (Hypoxidaceae) in Southern Africa. Magnolia Press. ISBN 9781775575054. OCLC 904051097.
- Snijman, D.A.; Hall, A.V. (1994). Systematics of Hesses, Strumaria and Carpolyza (Amaryllideae; Amaryllidaceae). Bolus Herbarium, University of Cape Town. OCLC 762205601.
- Manning, John; Goldblatt, Peter; Snijman, Dee (2002). The color encyclopedia of Cape bulbs. Timber Press. ISBN 9780881925470. OCLC 469411205.
