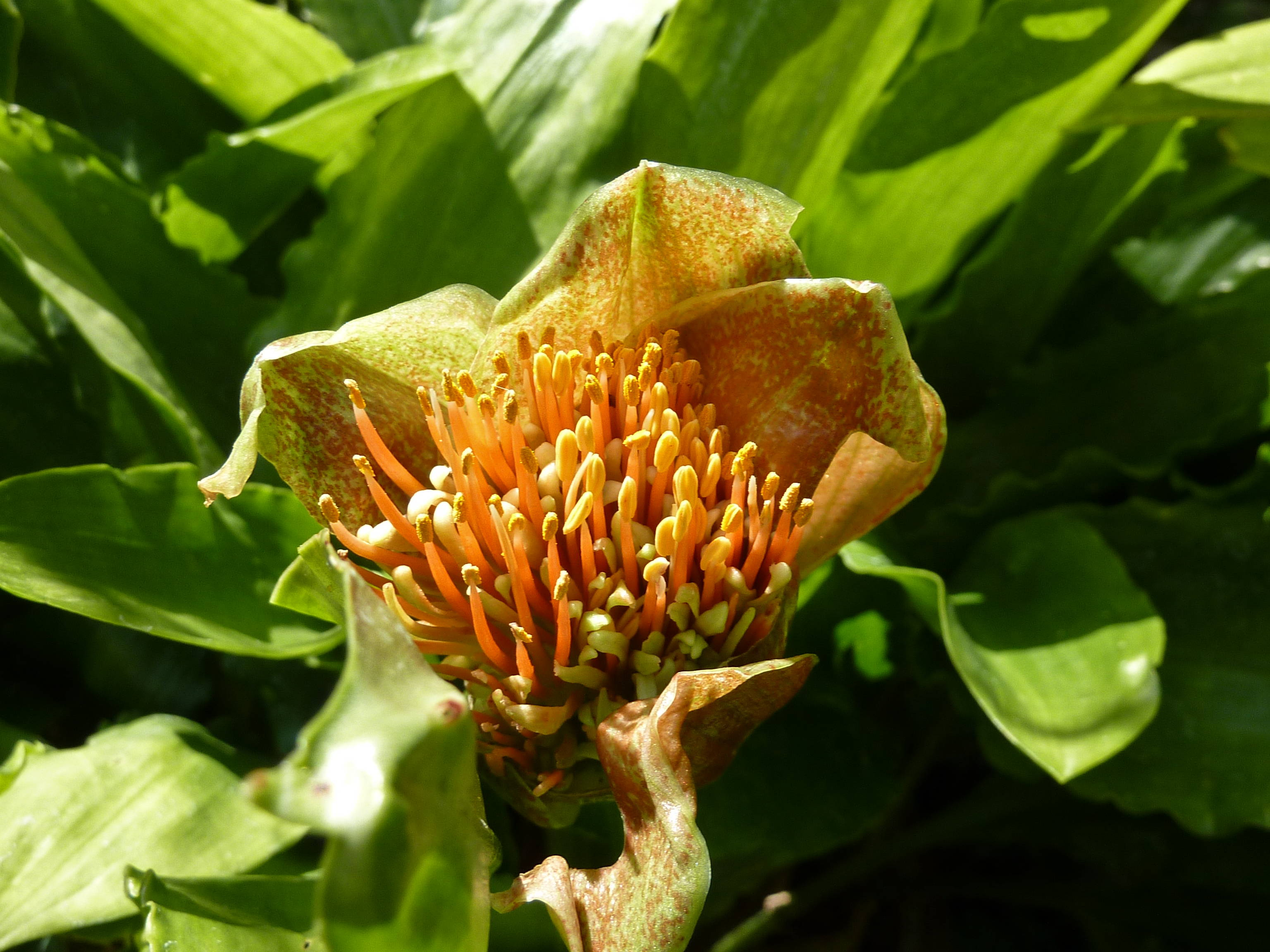
- In cultivation in Basel

Scientific classification
- Kingdom: Plantae
- Clade: Tracheophytes
- Clade: Angiosperms
- Clade: Monocots
- Order: Asparagales
- Family: Amaryllidaceae
- Subfamily: Amaryllidoideae
- Genus: Scadoxus
- Species: S. membranaceus

Binomial name
- Scadoxus membranaceus (Baker) Friis & Nordal

Synonyms
- Haemanthus membranaceus Baker; Haemanthus puniceus var. membranaceus (Baker) Baker

= Scadoxus membranaceus =

Species of plant

Scadoxus membranaceus is a flowering plant in the Amaryllidaceae family. It is a bulbous plant from South Africa (east Cape Province, KwaZulu-Natal). The smallest of the species of Scadoxus, it is sometimes cultivated as an ornamental plant where a minimum temperature of 5 °C (41 °F) can be maintained.

== Description ==
Scadoxus membranaceus is the smallest of the species in the genus Scadoxus. It grows from a bulb from which three or four thin leaves appear. The leaf stalk (petiole) is 3–6 in (8–15 cm) long and the leaf blade 4–6 in (10–15 cm) long. The flowers are borne in an umbel about 1.5 in (3.8 cm) across on the end of a leafless stem (scape). Bracts underneath the umbel (usually four) enclose it, more or less to the same height as the tips of the flowers. The bracts, which are usually coloured, persist throughout flowering and fruiting. Individual flowers are described as being green, pink or pale red in colour. The tepals are fused at the base forming a tube about a third of the length of the flower. The stamens and style are slightly longer than the flowers and so protrude. The ripe berries have been described as "especially showy".

== Taxonomy ==
Scadoxus membranaceus was first named by John Gilbert Baker in 1888 as Haemanthus membranaceus. He later described it a variety of Haemanthus puniceus (now Scadoxus puniceus). Baker did not explain the origin of the specific epithet membranaceus. Its usual botanical meaning is "thin, film-like, flexible". He did describe the leaves as "very thin in texture", the only feature described in this way.

Scadoxus had been separated from Haemanthus by Constantine Samuel Rafinesque in 1838, when he moved Haemanthus multiflorus to Scadoxus multiflorus. This separation was ignored by most workers until 1976, when Scadoxus was again segregated from Haemanthus by Ib Friis and Inger Nordal. Haemanthus species form true bulbs and have 2n = 16 chromosomes, whereas Scadoxus species do not all form bulbs and have 2n = 18 chromosomes. Haemanthus species are all native to southern Africa, whereas most Scadoxus species are found in tropical Africa, although this is not true of S. membranaceus which is from eastern South Africa.

=== Relationships ===
Scadoxus membranaceus is very similar in many respects to Scadoxus puniceus. The two species were shown to be closely related in phylogenetic analyses based on morphological features carried out by Nordal and Duncan. They differ in only three of the 25 characters used in the study: S. membranaceus lacks a pseudostem, S. puniceus has one; S. membranaceus has exactly four bracts below the umbel, S. puniceus has more than four; S. membranaceus has pedicels less than 1 cm long, S. puniceus has pedicels more than 1 cm long.

== Distribution and habitat ==
Scadoxus membranaceus is native to the east coast of South Africa, from the east of Cape Province in the south to KwaZulu-Natal in the north. It grows in areas of coastal sand, and on rocks as a lithophyte where there is sufficient accumulated material to form an open rooting medium.

== Cultivation ==
Scadoxus membranaceus is not common in cultivation, but can be grown with a minimum temperature of 5 °C (41 °F), such as provided by a heated greenhouse in less favourable climates. An open growing medium is required, such as that used for orchids. Propagation is by seed. Pests are those of Scadoxus generally.

== Toxicity ==
The genus Scadoxus is known to have some strongly toxic species, containing poisonous alkaloids. These are lethal to animals, such as sheep and goats, that graze on the plants. Other species of Scadoxus have been used in parts of tropical Africa as components of arrow poisons and fishing poisons.
