= Scadoxus pseudocaulus =

Scientific classification
- Kingdom: Plantae
- Clade: Tracheophytes
- Clade: Angiosperms
- Clade: Monocots
- Order: Asparagales
- Family: Amaryllidaceae
- Subfamily: Amaryllidoideae
- Genus: Scadoxus
- Species: S. pseudocaulus

Binomial name
- Scadoxus pseudocaulus (I.Bjørnstad & Friis) Friis & Nordal

Synonyms
- Haemanthus pseudocaulus I.Bjørnstad & Friis

Species of flowering plant

Scadoxus pseudocaulus is a herbaceous plant native to Nigeria, Equatorial Guinea, Cameroon and Gabon. Similar in many respects to Scadoxus cinnabarinus, it is cultivated as an ornamental plant but has proved reluctant to flower.

== Description ==
Scadoxus pseudocaulus was shown to be closely related to Scadoxus cinnabarinus in a 1984 cladistic analysis based on morphological features. It is one of the group of Scadoxus species that grows from rhizomes alone rather than also having bulbs. It differs from Scadoxus cinnabarinus mainly in having a pseudostem – a false stems produced by the tightly wrapped bases of the leaf stalks (petioles). Another difference is that the free segments at the ends of the tepals (the basal parts of the tepals being fused into a tube) are narrower, with usually only three veins instead of five. The flowers are arranged in a cone- or globe-shaped umbel of 20–50 individual flowers.

== Taxonomy ==
Scadoxus pseudocaulus was first collected for science in 1935. It was first formally described as a separate species in 1972 by Inger Bjørnstad (née Nordal) and Ib Friis, as Haemanthus pseudocaulus.

Scadoxus had been separated from Haemanthus by Constantine Samuel Rafinesque in 1838, when he moved Haemanthus multiflorus to Scadoxus multiflorus. This separation was ignored by most workers until 1976, when Scadoxus was again segregated from Haemanthus by Friis and Nordal, and Haemanthus pseudocaulus was transferred to Scadoxus pseudocaulus.

== Distribution and habitat ==
Scadoxus pseudocaulus occurs natively within the range of Scadoxus cinnabarinus but is less widespread, being found only in southern Nigeria, Equatorial Guinea, Cameroon and Gabon. It was collected growing near to sea level, and is found up to altitudes of 1,400 m (4,600 ft) in regions of high rainfall.

== Cultivation ==
Jonathan Hutchinson, the UK National Plant Collection holder for the genus, has described the cultivation of Scadoxus pseudocaulus. Although in many respects similar to Scadoxus cinnabarinus, it tolerates lower temperatures, with occasional drops to 5 °C (41 °F). The growing medium should be kept drier during the colder months. Plants in cultivation do not readily produce flowers. Some plants in cultivation as Scadoxus pseudocaulus have turned out to be different species of Scadoxus when they do eventually flower. Pests are those of Scadoxus generally.
