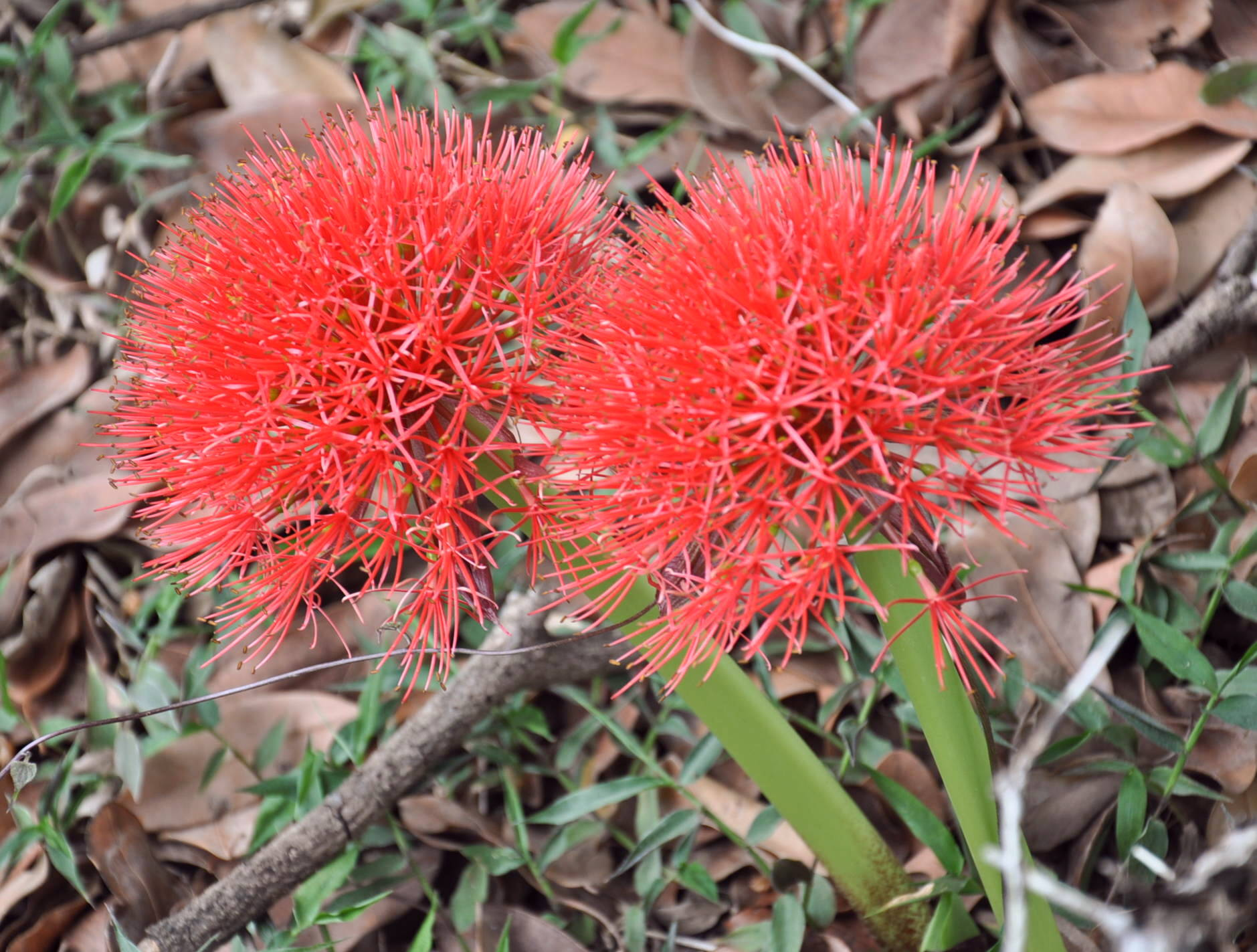
- Scadoxus multiflorus in Zambia

Scientific classification
- Kingdom: Plantae
- Clade: Tracheophytes
- Clade: Angiosperms
- Clade: Monocots
- Order: Asparagales
- Family: Amaryllidaceae
- Subfamily: Amaryllidoideae
- Genus: Scadoxus; Raf.

Type species
- Scadoxus multiflorus Raf.

Synonyms
- Nerissa Salisb.; Demeusea De Wild. & T.Durand.; Choananthus Rendle

= Scadoxus =

Genus of flowering plants

Scadoxus is a genus of African and Arabian plants in the Amaryllis family, subfamily Amaryllidoideae. The English names blood lily or blood flower are used for some of the species. The genus has close affinities with Haemanthus. Species of Scadoxus are grown as ornamental plants for their brilliantly coloured flowers, either in containers or in the ground in frost-free climates. Although some species have been used in traditional medicine, they contain poisonous alkaloids.

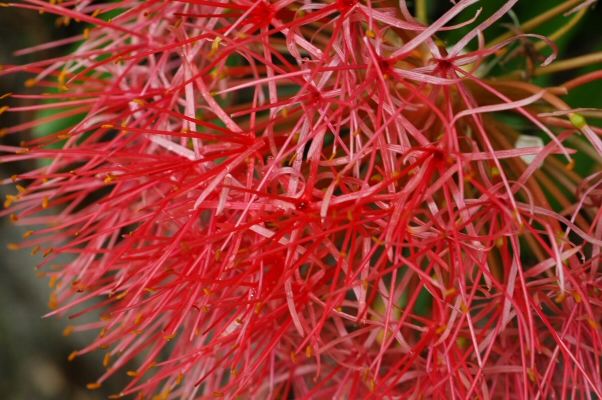
S. multiflorus (Blood Lily)

== Description ==
Species of Scadoxus grow from bulbs or rhizomes. Bulbous species usually also have distinct rhizomes. Particularly in the non-bulbous species, the petioles (leaf stalks) overlap to produce a false stem or pseudostem, which may be purple-spotted. The leaf blades are lanceolate to ovate with a thickened midrib. The leafless flowering stem (scape) is also sometimes purple-spotted, and either appears from among the leaves or pushes through the side of the pseudostem.

The flowers are borne at the top of the scape in the form of a many-flowered umbel. Four or more bracts are present under the umbel at first. In some species, such as Scadoxus membranaceus, these bracts persist during flowering; in other species they wither before the flowers are fully open. Individual flowers have six red to pink tepals, joined at the base to form a tube. In most species, the flowers are more-or-less upright, although in Scadoxus cyrtanthiflorus the open flowers droop and in Scadoxus nutans the top of the scape bends over so that the flowers face downwards. The filaments of the stamens arise from the base of the tepals and may be flattened. The fruit takes the form of a globose berry, orange to red when ripe.

== Taxonomy ==
The genus was given its name in 1838 by Constantine Samuel Rafinesque. Rafinesque glossed the name as "umb. glor." (possibly meaning umbella gloriosa, "glorious umbel"). Doxus, meaning "glory" or "splendour" in Greek, is usually interpreted as a reference to the often scarlet flowers of the genus. The prefix sca may be derived from the Greek skia meaning "shade" (sciadon is the Greek equivalent of the Latin umbella, "umbrella", used of flower heads in the form of umbels).

=== Relationships ===
Scadoxus is placed in tribe Haemantheae within the subfamily Amaryllidoideae, a tribe reserved for genera with fruit in the form of berries (baccate fruit). The tribe is predominantly African in origin and comprises six genera: Apodolirion, Gethyllis, Haemanthus, Scadoxus, Clivia and Cryptostephanus. The single most parsimonious phylogenetic tree found by analysis of both nuclear and plastid DNA in a 2004 study showed that Scadoxus is most closely related to Haemanthus:

- Haemantheae
  - - Apodolirion, Gethyllis
    - - Haemanthus
      - Scadoxus
  - - Clivia
    - Cryptostephanus

Scadoxus was originally separated from Haemanthus by Rafinesque in 1838. His type species, Scadoxus multiflorus, had been described as Haemanthus multiflorus by Thomas Martyn in 1795. This separation was ignored by most workers until 1976, when Scadoxus was recognised as a distinct genus by Ib Friis and Inger Nordal. Haemanthus species are southern in distribution, form true bulbs and have 2n = 16 chromosomes, whereas Scadoxus species are found throughout tropical Africa, do not all form bulbs and have 2n = 18 chromosomes. The leaves of the two genera are also different. The leaves of Scadoxus species are thin, spirally arranged, with a distinct stalk (petiole); in some species their bases form a pseudostem. The leaves of Haemanthus species are thicker, opposite, without a distinct petiole, and never form a pseudostem.

=== Species ===
As of March 2014, the World Checklist of Selected Plant Families accepts the following nine species, one with three subspecies:

Image	Scientific name	Distribution
	Scadoxus cinnabarinus (Decne.) Friis & Nordal	west and central Africa
	Scadoxus cyrtanthiflorus (C.H.Wright) Friis & Nordal	Rwenzori Mountains in Uganda + Zaïre
	Scadoxus longifolius (De Wild. & T.Durand) Friis & Nordal	west Africa
	Scadoxus membranaceus (Baker) Friis & Nordal	South Africa
	Scadoxus multiflorus (Martyn) Raf. (Blood Lily)	tropical and southern Africa and parts of the Arabian Peninsula
	Scadoxus nutans (Friis & I.Bjørnstad) Friis & Nordal	Ethiopia
	Scadoxus pole-evansii (Oberm.) Friis & Nordal	Zimbabwe
	Scadoxus pseudocaulus (I.Bjørnstad & Friis) Friis & Nordal	tropical Africa
	Scadoxus puniceus (L.) Friis & Nordal	South Africa, Tanzania and Ethiopia

Nordal and Duncan explored the relationship between eight of the species in a 1984 analysis based on morphological features (the little-known Scadoxus longiflorus was excluded). Their preferred cladogram was:

- - rhizomes only
    - Scadoxus cyrtanthiflorus
    - Scadoxus nutans
    - - Scadoxus pseudocaulus
      - Scadoxus cinnabarinus
  - bulbs
    - - Scadoxus multiflorus
      - Scadoxus pole-evansii
    - - Scadoxus puniceus
      - Scadoxus membranaceus

The main division is between a group which does not have bulbs, only rhizomes, and one which has bulbs, usually with rhizomes as well.

== Distribution and habitat ==
The genus as a whole is distributed in sub-Saharan Africa and in the Arabian Peninsula. It has been introduced into parts of Mexico. The most widely distributed species is Scadoxus multiflorus, whose subspecies S. m. subsp. multiflorus is found throughout tropical and southern Africa and is the only member of the genus found in the Arabian Peninsula. By contrast, Scadoxus cyrtanthiflorus is found only in the Rwenzori Mountains on the border between Uganda and the Democratic Republic of the Congo.

Most species are found in tropical forests, where they grow in warm, moist conditions in shade, either in soil or as epiphytes. The three species found in temperate regions of South Africa are more bulbous in habit than the tropical species; Scadoxus puniceus has been found growing in sand dunes and dry cliff faces.

== Cultivation ==
The cultivation of Scadoxus species has been described by Jonathan Hutchinson, the UK National Plant Collection holder for the genus. All species occur naturally in areas of summer rainfall, and in cultivation tend to start in growth in spring after a period of winter dormancy. The three species found in South Africa, S. multiflorus, S. puniceus and S. membranaceous, are the most widely cultivated, being tolerant of winter temperatures down to 5 °C (41 °F). S. multiflorus subsp. multiflorus is cultivated for sale in large quantities by the Dutch nursery industry.

The tropical species require a minimum temperature of at least 10 °C (50 °F), thriving in a warm, humid atmosphere. An open organic potting medium, similar to that used for orchids, suits all species. A coarse mix with considerable air spaces is particularly important for epiphytic species such as S. nutans.

Pests of Scadoxus in cultivation in the UK include mealy bugs and narcissus bulb fly (Merodon equestris). Red spider mites (Tetranychus species), slugs and snails can also cause problems. In South Africa, where species such as S. puniceus can be grown outside, lily borer (Brithys crini) attacks plants.

=== Cultivars ===
Some artificial hybrids between S. multiflorus subsp. katherinae and S. puniceus are known. Johannes Nicolai raised S. 'König Albert' which flowered for the first time in 1899. Although rare in cultivation, it multiplies rapidly. Of the same parentage is S. 'Andromeda', raised by C. G. van Tubergen around 1904.

== Toxicity and uses ==
The genus Scadoxus is known to have some strongly toxic species, containing poisonous alkaloids. These are lethal to animals, such as sheep and goats, that graze on the leaves or bulbs. Scadoxus multiflorus and Scadoxus cinnabarinus are traditionally used in parts of tropical Africa as components of arrow poisons and fishing poisons. Both species, as well as Scadoxus puniceus in South Africa, are used in traditional medicine.

== Bibliography ==
- Duncan, G. (2013), "A synoptic review of Scadoxus Raf. (Amaryllidaceae) with notes on cultivation", Herbertia, 66: 189–224
- Hutchinson, J. (2007), "Scadoxus of South Africa", The Plantsman, New Series, 6 (1): 10–14
- Hutchinson, J. (2014), "Scadoxus of central and east Africa", The Plantsman, New Series, 13 (1): 36–42
