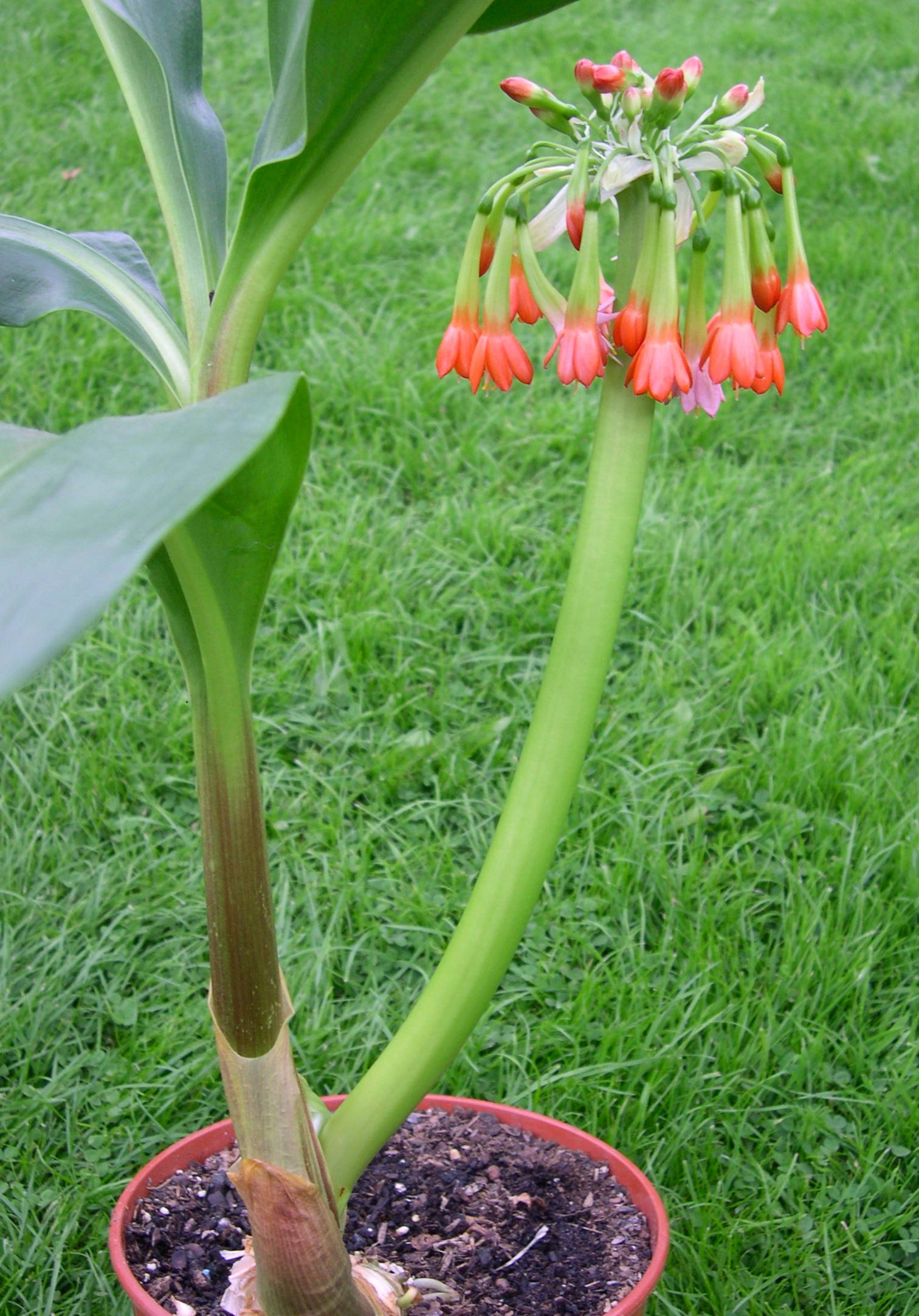
- In cultivation

Scientific classification
- Kingdom: Plantae
- Clade: Tracheophytes
- Clade: Angiosperms
- Clade: Monocots
- Order: Asparagales
- Family: Amaryllidaceae
- Subfamily: Amaryllidoideae
- Genus: Scadoxus
- Species: S. cyrtanthiflorus

Binomial name
- Scadoxus cyrtanthiflorus (C.H.Wright) Friis & Nordal

Synonyms
- Choananthus cyrtanthiflorus (C.H.Wright) Rendle; Choananthus wollastoni Rendle; Haemanthus cyrtanthiflorus C.H.Wright

= Scadoxus cyrtanthiflorus =

Species of flowering plant

Scadoxus cyrtanthiflorus is a herbaceous plant endemic to the Rwenzori Mountains of east tropical Africa. Unusually for the genus Scadoxus its tubular blooms are pendant. It is sometimes grown as an ornamental plant in heated greenhouses.

== Description ==
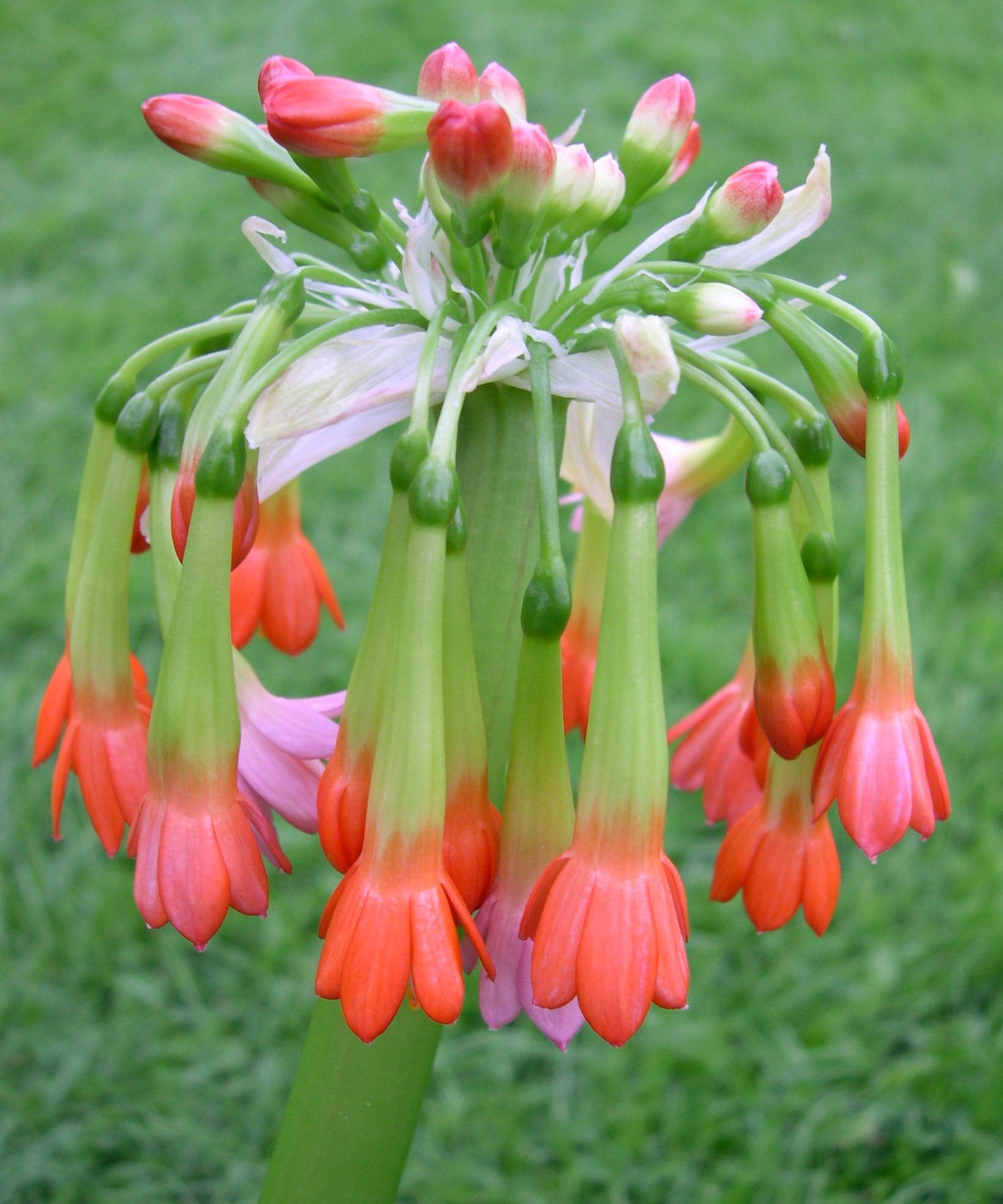
Flowers

Scadoxus cyrtanthiflorus is a herbaceous plant growing from a relatively long rhizome. The bases of the leaves (petioles) are tightly wrapped to form a pseudostem or false stem up to 60 cm (24 in) long. The blade of the leaf is elongated, lanceolate in shape. The flowers and leaves appear together. The flowers are borne in an umbel on a scape (leafless stem) 15–45 cm (6–18 in) long; the whole plant is up to 75 cm (30 in) tall. The flower bud begins growth inside the pseudostem but soon breaks through it to appear at the side. The bracts underneath the umbel soon wither.

The umbel is made up of 10–25 individual flowers, each on a 15–35 mm (0.6–1.4 in) long pedicel (flower stalk). The flowers are directed downwards, unusually for the genus (only Scadoxus nutans shares this characteristic, but in this case the scape bends over). The colour of the flowers varies from a greenish tube, 25–40 mm (1.0–1.6 in) long, formed by the fused bases of the tepals, through white to salmon pink or scarlet at their 10–15 mm (0.4–0.6 in) long free tips. The filaments of the stamens are flattened and do not protrude from the flowers (another difference from most other species of Scadoxus). The fruit is a berry, 15–20 mm (0.6–0.8 in) across.

== Taxonomy ==
Scadoxus cyrtanthiflorus was first collected in 1895 by the South African botanist George F. Scott-Elliott. However, his specimen was poorly preserved and it was based on a later collection that Charles Henry Wright described and named the species as Haemanthus cyrtanthiflorus in 1906. The specific epithet cyrtanthiflorus means "flowers like Cyrtanthus".

Scadoxus was originally separated from Haemanthus by Constantine Samuel Rafinesque in 1838, when he moved Haemanthus multiflorus to Scadoxus multiflorus. This separation was ignored by most workers until 1976, when Scadoxus was again segregated from Haemanthus by Friis and Nordal. Haemanthus species are southern in distribution, form true bulbs and have 2n = 16 chromosomes, whereas Scadoxus species, such as S. cyrtanthiflorus, are found throughout tropical Africa, do not all form bulbs and have 2n = 18 chromosomes.

== Distribution and habitat ==
Scadoxus cyrtanthiflorus is endemic to the Rwenzori Mountains on the border between Uganda and the Democratic Republic of the Congo. It grows at altitudes of between 1,600–3,200 m (5,200–10,500 ft), but is mostly found at around 2,000–2,400 m (6,600–7,900 ft). Plants normally grow in constantly moist, shady habitats in forest undergrowth, either in the ground in highly organic soils, as epiphytes on tree trunks or on rocks and boulders.

== Cultivation ==
In 2004, S. cyrtanthiflorus was said to be unknown in cultivation, although in 1928 it had received an RHS Award of Merit. In 2014, it was among those described as "becoming more widely grown." In cultivation, S. cyrtanthiflorus is said to grow "well, if quite slowly, with most growth being in spring and autumn." The recommended potting medium is a very open organic mix, as would be used for orchids. Pests are those of Scadoxus generally.

== Toxicity ==
The genus Scadoxus is known to have some strongly toxic species, containing poisonous alkaloids. These are lethal to animals, such as sheep and goats, that graze on the plants. Other species of Scadoxus have been used in parts of tropical Africa as components of arrow poisons and fishing poisons.
