= Scadoxus longifolius =

Scientific classification
- Kingdom: Plantae
- Clade: Tracheophytes
- Clade: Angiosperms
- Clade: Monocots
- Order: Asparagales
- Family: Amaryllidaceae
- Subfamily: Amaryllidoideae
- Genus: Scadoxus
- Species: S. longifolius

Binomial name
- Scadoxus longifolius (De Wild. & T.Durand) Friis & Nordal

Synonyms
- Demeusea longifolia De Wild. & T.Durand; Haemanthus longifolius (De Wild. & T.Durand) Traub

Species of flowering plant

Scadoxus longifolius is a herbaceous plant from Zaire. It is only known from a single collection, and little information is available about it. It appears to be closely related to Scadoxus cinnabarinus, and Inger Nordal and Thomas Duncan suggested in 1984 that it may not be a distinct species.

== Taxonomy ==
The species was first named in 1900 as Demeusea longifolia by Émile De Wildeman & Théophile Durand. In 1952, it was transferred to the genus Haemanthus by Hamilton Traub. Scadoxus had been separated from Haemanthus by Constantine Samuel Rafinesque in 1838, when he moved Haemanthus multiflorus to Scadoxus multiflorus. This separation was ignored by most workers until 1976, when Scadoxus was again segregated from Haemanthus by Ib Friis and Inger Nordal. Haemanthus species are southern in distribution, form true bulbs and have 2n = 16 chromosomes, whereas Scadoxus species, such as S. longifolius, are found throughout tropical Africa, do not all form bulbs and have 2n = 18 chromosomes.

Scadoxus longifolius appears to be closely related to Scadoxus cinnabarinus and may not be a distinct species.
