= Scadoxus nutans =

Conservation status
- Vulnerable (IUCN 3.1)

Scientific classification
- Kingdom: Plantae
- Clade: Tracheophytes
- Clade: Angiosperms
- Clade: Monocots
- Order: Asparagales
- Family: Amaryllidaceae
- Subfamily: Amaryllidoideae
- Genus: Scadoxus
- Species: S. nutans

Binomial name
- Scadoxus nutans (Friis & I.Bjørnstad) Friis & Nordal

Synonyms
- Haemanthus nutans Friis & I.Bjørnstad

Species of flowering plant

Scadoxus nutans is a herbaceous plant endemic to southwest Ethiopia. Its red to pink flowers face downwards as the top of the flowering stem bends over, unlike any of the other species of Scadoxus. It grows mainly as an epiphyte in tropical mountain forests, which are disappearing, making the species vulnerable to extinction. It is sometimes cultivated as an ornamental plant.

== Description ==
Scadoxus nutans grows from a rhizome, with growth occurring mainly in spring and autumn. The whole plant is usually 30–50 cm (12–20 in) tall, occasionally as high as 1 m (3 ft). The overlapping bases of the leaf stalks (petioles) form a false stem or pseudostem, which emerges from the side of last year's pseudostem. The pseudostem is green, marked with brown spots, and is about 25–40 cm (10–16 in) long. The narrow leaf blades have wavy edges and spread out from the pseudostem, being up to 40 cm (16 in) long and 8 cm (3 in) wide.

The flowers are borne on a leafless stalk (scape), which is bent over during flowering so that the flowers face downwards. no other species of Scadoxus has similarly nodding flowers. The umbel of 2–30 flowers has a dense brush-like appearance and is surrounded by a number of bracts, which persist until fruiting occurs. Individual flowers are carried on short stems (pedicels), less than 1 cm (0.4 in) long, and have red to pink tepals, fused at the base for about 8 mm (0.3 in) with narrow free segments up to 20 mm (0.8 in) long. When the flowers fade and fruits are formed, the scape straightens, so that the ripe red berries, about 15 mm (0.6 in) long, are held upright. The sticky seeds are elongated, about 10 mm (0.4 in) long and 3 mm (0.1 in) wide. All other species of Scadoxus have ovoid or spherical seeds.

== Taxonomy ==
The species was first described in 1971 by Ib Friis and Inger Bjørnstad, being initially placed in the genus Haemanthus. In 1976, the same two authors (the latter under a different surname) transferred the species to Scadoxus as part of their segregation of the two genera. The specific epithet nutans refers to the nodding umbel of flowers.

== Distribution and habitat ==
Scadoxus nutans is an Ethiopian endemic. It is found in the Kaffa and Illubabor regions in the southwest of the country. It occurs only in evergreen mountain forests, between 1,000 m (3,300 ft) and 2,500 m (8,200 ft) in elevation. Although occasionally found growing on the ground, it grows mainly as an epiphyte, with no apparent preference for the host species of tree.

== Conservation ==
Scadoxus nutans is described as "vulnerable" as the mountain forest on which it depends is continually being lost through changes of land use. The Ethiopian Tree Fund Foundation (ETFF) is endeavouring to maintain and restore native forest by working with local farmers.

== Cultivation ==
Scadoxus nutans can be cultivated where the necessary temperature can be maintained in the winter (at least 10 °C (50 °F)). In a pot it requires a very open, coarse organic growing medium. Jonathan Hutchinson, the UK National Plant Collection holder for Scadoxus, recommends the addition of lumps of tree fern stem. Pests are those of Scadoxus generally.

== Toxicity ==
The genus Scadoxus is known to have some strongly toxic species, containing poisonous alkaloids. These are lethal to animals, such as sheep and goats, that graze on the plants. Other species of Scadoxus have been used in parts of tropical Africa as components of arrow poisons and fishing poisons.
