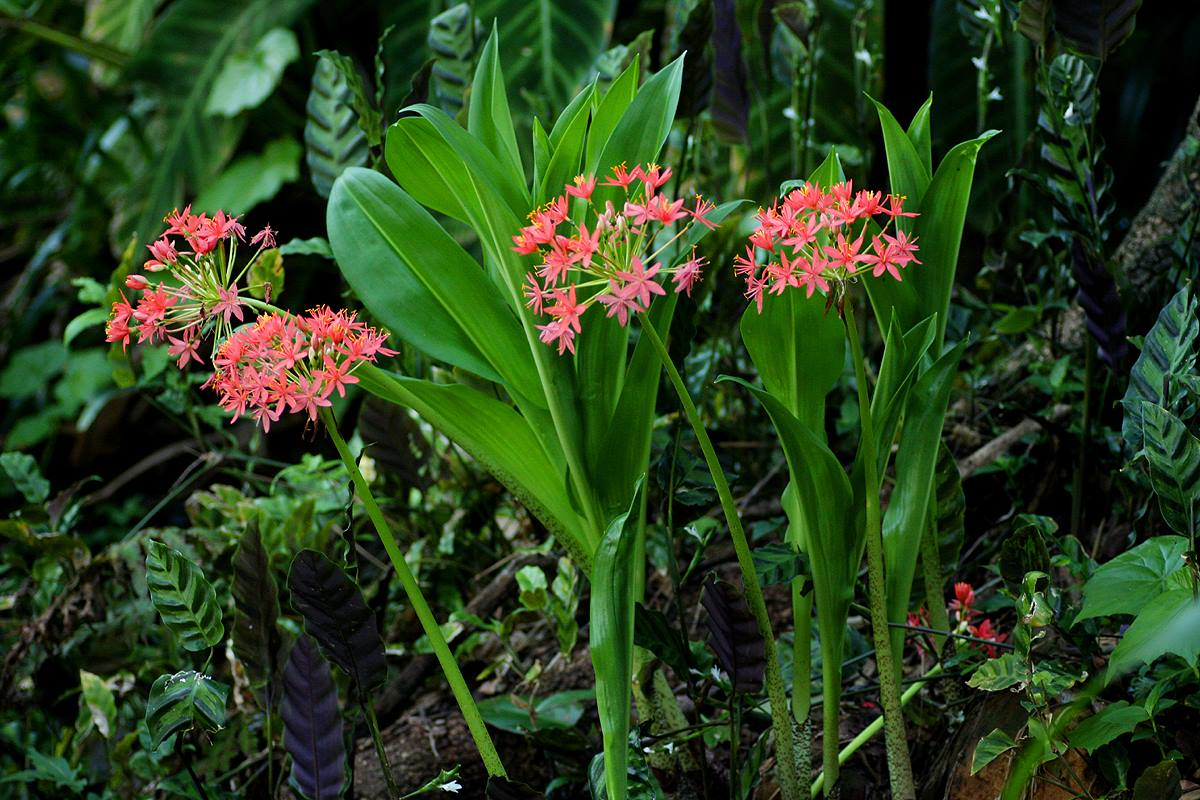

Scientific classification
- Kingdom: Plantae
- Clade: Tracheophytes
- Clade: Angiosperms
- Clade: Monocots
- Order: Asparagales
- Family: Amaryllidaceae
- Subfamily: Amaryllidoideae
- Genus: Scadoxus
- Species: S. pole-evansii

Binomial name
- Scadoxus pole-evansii (Oberm.) Friis & Nordal

Synonyms
- Haemanthus pole-evansii Oberm.

= Scadoxus pole-evansii =

Species of flowering plant

Scadoxus pole-evansii, commonly known as the Inyanga fireball, is a herbaceous plant endemic to mountains in east Zimbabwe. It was only discovered for science in 1960. Similar in many respects to the more widely grown Scadoxus multiflorus, it is cultivated as an ornamental plant.

== Description ==
Scadoxus pole-evansii has a similar growth habit to Scadoxus multiflorus subsp. katherinae, growing from a bulb with attached rhizomes. The bases of the leaves are grouped to form a false stem or pseudostem. Plants may be 1.2 m (4 ft) tall. The flowers are borne in the form of an umbel on an upright leafless stalk (scape). The bracts under the umbels turn downwards and are generally withered during flowering. Individual flowers have salmon-pink to vermilion tepals, fused at the base to form a short tube, and with broad, spreading free segments at the end, each generally with five veins. The fruits are berries, red to orange in colour.

== Taxonomy ==
The species was first discovered for science in 1960 by Reginald John Pole-Evans, growing in the Nyanga area of east Zimbabwe. It was formally described by Anna Amelia Obermeyer in 1963, as Haemanthus pole-evansii.

Scadoxus had been separated from Haemanthus by Constantine Samuel Rafinesque in 1838, when he moved Haemanthus multiflorus to Scadoxus multiflorus. This separation was ignored by most workers until 1976, when Scadoxus was again segregated from Haemanthus by Ib Friis and Inger Nordal, and Haemanthus pole-evansii was transferred to Scadoxus pole-evansii.

=== Relationships ===
Scadoxus pole-evansii is very similar in many respects to Scadoxus multiflorus. The two species were shown to be closely related in phylogenetic analyses based on morphological features carried out by Nordal and Duncan. One of the few differences is that the tepals of S. pole-evansii have broader free segments, generally with five veins, whereas those of S. multiflorus are narrower, more lanceolate, and generally have only three veins.

== Distribution and habitat ==
Scadoxus pole-evansii is endemic to the Nyanga region of east Zimbabwe. It grows in afromontane forest at 1,600–2,000 m (5,200–6,600 ft) in soil which is very open and humus-rich.

== Cultivation ==
Material of Scadoxus pole-evansii was sent to England at the time of its discovery. It first flowered there in January 1963, at the RHS Garden, Wisley. The species was given the RHS Award of Merit in July 1969.

In cultivation it requires similar conditions to the other tropical species of Scadoxus with a minimum temperature of 10 °C (50 °F) or more and an open, humus-rich growing medium. In the northern hemisphere it begins to grow in the summer, continues throughout the winter, and becomes dormant in the early spring. Pests are those of Scadoxus generally.

== Toxicity ==
The genus Scadoxus is known to have some strongly toxic species, containing poisonous alkaloids. These are lethal to animals, such as sheep and goats, that graze on the plants. Other species of Scadoxus have been used in parts of tropical Africa as components of arrow poisons and fishing poisons.
