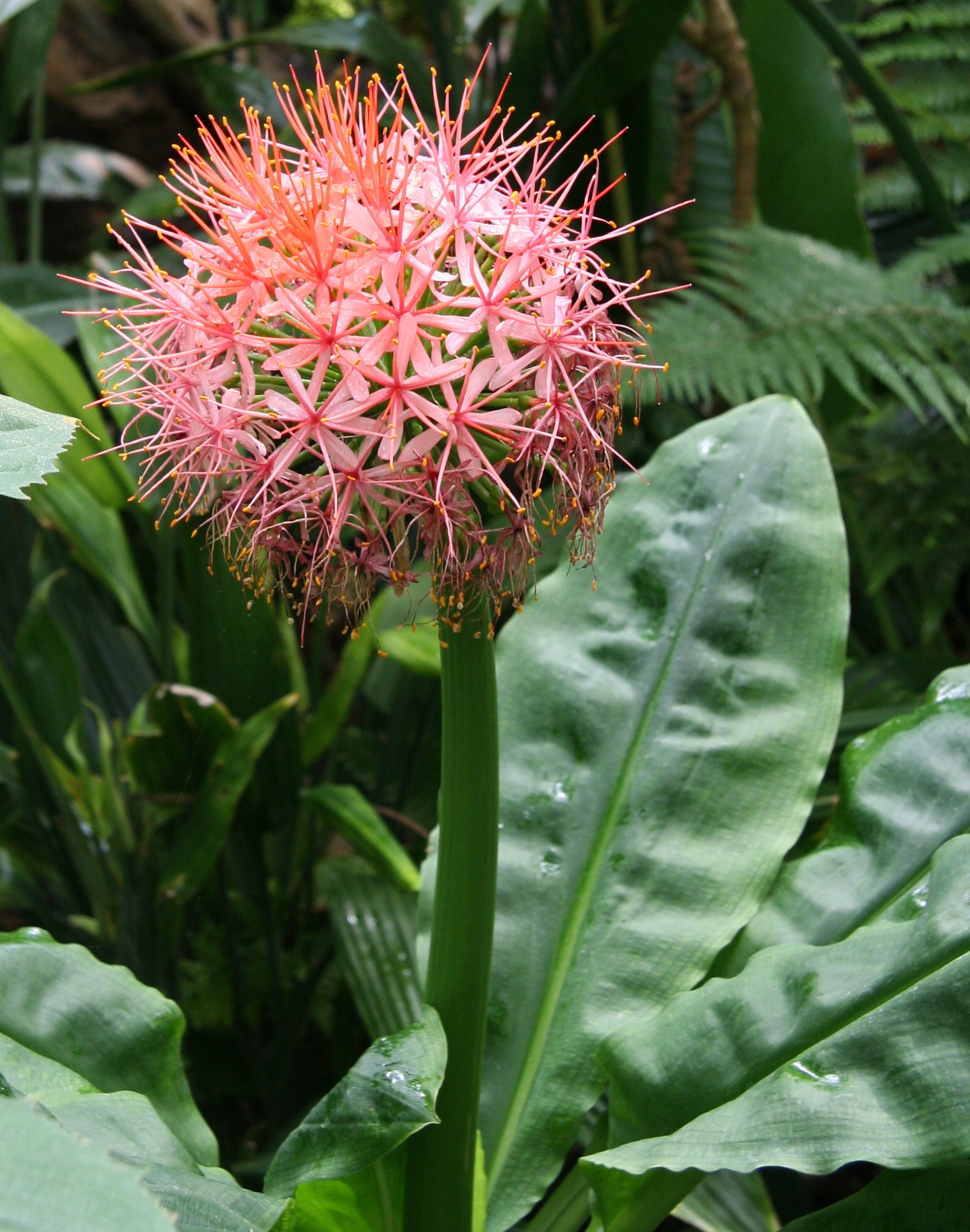
- In cultivation in Dresden Botanical Garden

Scientific classification
- Kingdom: Plantae
- Clade: Tracheophytes
- Clade: Angiosperms
- Clade: Monocots
- Order: Asparagales
- Family: Amaryllidaceae
- Subfamily: Amaryllidoideae
- Genus: Scadoxus
- Species: S. cinnabarinus

Binomial name
- Scadoxus cinnabarinus (Decne.) Friis & Nordal

Synonyms
- Haemanthus cinnabarinus Decne. Haemanthus angolensis Welw. Haemanthus brachyandrus Baker; Haemanthus cabrae De Wild. & T.Durand; Haemanthus congolensis De Wild. Haemanthus demeusei De Wild. Haemanthus diadema L.Linden; Haemanthus eetveldeanus De Wild. & T.Durand; Haemanthus fascinator L.Linden; Haemanthus germarianus J.Braun & K.Schum. Haemanthus kundianus J.Braun & K.Schum. Haemanthus laurentii De Wild. Haemanthus lescrauwaetii De Wild. ex Gentil; Haemanthus lindenii N.E.Br. Haemanthus longipes Engl. Haemanthus mirabilis L.Linden; Haemanthus radcliffei Rendle; Haemanthus rotularis Baker

= Scadoxus cinnabarinus =

Species of flowering plant

Scadoxus cinnabarinus is a herbaceous plant from tropical rainforest in Africa. It is native to Western and Central Africa from Sierra Leone in the far west to Angola in the south. It has been reported from Ghana, Côte d'Ivoire, Nigeria, Niger, Sierra Leone, Central African Republic, Cameroon, Congo, Equatorial Guinea, Gabon, São Tomé, Zaire, Uganda, and Angola.

== Description ==
Scadoxus cinnabarinus grows from a short rhizome. Many other species of Scadoxus have a pseudostem (false stem) formed from the tightly wrapped bases of the leaves. Scadoxus cinnabarinus has at most a very short pseudostem, making the plant shorter than other species, with an overall height of up to 60 cm (24 in). The flowers are borne on a scape (leafless stem) which emerges from the centre of the leaves and is usually not much taller than them, with a height of 15–40 cm (6–16 in). Up to 100 (but usually fewer) orange-red flowers are arranged in an umbel at the top of the scape. The bracts underneath the umbel have withered by the time of full flowering. The individual pedicels (flower stalks) are 15–45 mm (0.6–1.8 in) long, and bend downwards when the fruit (a berry) is formed, whereas in most other species of Scadoxus they are upright at this stage.

The flowers are somewhat differently shaped in different parts of the range of the species. In particular, individual flowers from East Africa, especially Uganda, have a long tube at the base formed by the fusion of the tepals, up to 15 mm (0.6 in) long, whereas elsewhere the tube may be as short as 3 mm (0.1 in). The width of the leaves also varies throughout the range. This variation has resulted in a substantial number of names for what appears to be a single widespread and variable species.

== Taxonomy ==
Scadoxus cinnabarinus was sent to Joseph Decaisne in 1855 from Gabon, and formally named by him in 1857 as Haemanthus cinnabarinus. The specific epithet cinnabarinus refers to the colour of the flowers, which Decaisne described as "rouge cinabre vif" (bright cinnabar red).

Many other names within the genus Haemanthus are now considered to be synonyms of Scadoxus cinnabarinus:

- Haemanthus angolensis Welw.
- Haemanthus brachyandrus Baker
- Haemanthus cabrae De Wild. & T.Durand
- Haemanthus congolensis De Wild.
- Haemanthus demeusei De Wild.
- Haemanthus diadema L.Linden
- Haemanthus eetveldeanus De Wild. & T.Durand
- Haemanthus fascinator L.Linden
- Haemanthus germarianus J.Braun & K.Schum.
- Haemanthus kundianus J.Braun & K.Schum.
- Haemanthus laurentii De Wild.
- Haemanthus lescrauwaetii De Wild. ex Gentil
- Haemanthus lindenii N.E.Br.
- Haemanthus longipes Engl.
- Haemanthus mirabilis L.Linden
- Haemanthus radcliffei Rendle
- Haemanthus rotularis Baker

Scadoxus was originally separated from Haemanthus by Constantine Samuel Rafinesque in 1838, when he moved Haemanthus multiflorus to Scadoxus multiflorus. This separation was ignored by most workers until 1976, when Scadoxus was again segregated from Haemanthus by Ib Friis and Inger Nordal. Haemanthus species are southern in distribution, form true bulbs and have 2n = 16 chromosomes, whereas Scadoxus species, such as S. cinnabarinus, are found throughout tropical Africa, do not all form bulbs and have 2n = 18 chromosomes.

== Distribution and habitat ==
Scadoxus cinnabarinus is widely distributed around the Congo Basin from Sierra Leone in the north to Angola in the south. It is found in tropical rainforest, in humid shady habitats subject to high rainfall, where the soils are largely organic.

== Cultivation ==
Scadoxus cinnabarinus has been cultivated in heated greenhouses ("stove-houses") since it was sent to Europe in 1855. Its requirement for a high temperature makes its cultivation demanding. Like other species of Scadoxus from tropical rainforests, it requires an open organic soil to ensure good drainage and aeration around the roots, together with shade from strong sun. Pests are those of Scadoxus generally.

== Toxicity and uses ==
The genus Scadoxus is known to have some strongly toxic species, containing poisonous alkaloids. These are lethal to animals, such as sheep and goats, that graze on the plants. Scadoxus cinnabarinus has been used in parts of tropical Africa as a component of arrow poisons and fish poisons. It is also used in traditional medicine.
