= Powderpuff lily =

Powderpuff lily may refer to:

- Scadoxus multiflorus, native to sub-Suharan Africa
- Scadoxus pole-evansii, endemic to eastern Zimbabwe

== See also ==
- Powderpuff lillypilly
