= Planchonia grandis =

Conservation status
- Near Threatened (IUCN 3.1)

Scientific classification
- Kingdom: Plantae
- Clade: Tracheophytes
- Clade: Angiosperms
- Clade: Eudicots
- Clade: Asterids
- Order: Ericales
- Family: Lecythidaceae
- Genus: Planchonia
- Species: P. grandis

Binomial name
- Planchonia grandis Ridl.

Species of plant

Planchonia grandis is tree in the family Lecythidaceae, native to Southeast Asia. The specific epithet grandis is from the Latin meaning 'tall', referring to its height.

== Description ==
Planchonia grandis grows up to 33 metres (110 ft) tall, with a trunk diameter of up to 1 m (3 ft). Its bark is reddish brown, grey or white. The flowers are greenish white.

== Distribution and habitat ==
Planchonia grandis is native to Sumatra, Peninsular Malaysia, Singapore and Borneo. Its habitat is mangrove and lowland mixed dipterocarp forests.

== Conservation ==
Planchonia grandis has been assessed as near threatened on the IUCN Red List. It is mainly threatened by its presence in low-elevation areas, where its habitat may be degraded by conversion for agriculture.
