= Planchonia brevistipitata =

Scientific classification
- Kingdom: Plantae
- Clade: Tracheophytes
- Clade: Angiosperms
- Clade: Eudicots
- Clade: Asterids
- Order: Ericales
- Family: Lecythidaceae
- Genus: Planchonia
- Species: P. brevistipitata

Binomial name
- Planchonia brevistipitata Kuswata

Species of tree

Planchonia brevistipitata grows as a small tree up to 15 metres (49 ft) tall. The bark is greyish to brown. The specific epithet brevistipitata is from the Latin meaning 'short stalk', referring to the flowers and fruit. Its habitat is riverine and lowland mixed dipterocarp forest. P. brevistipitata is endemic to Borneo.
