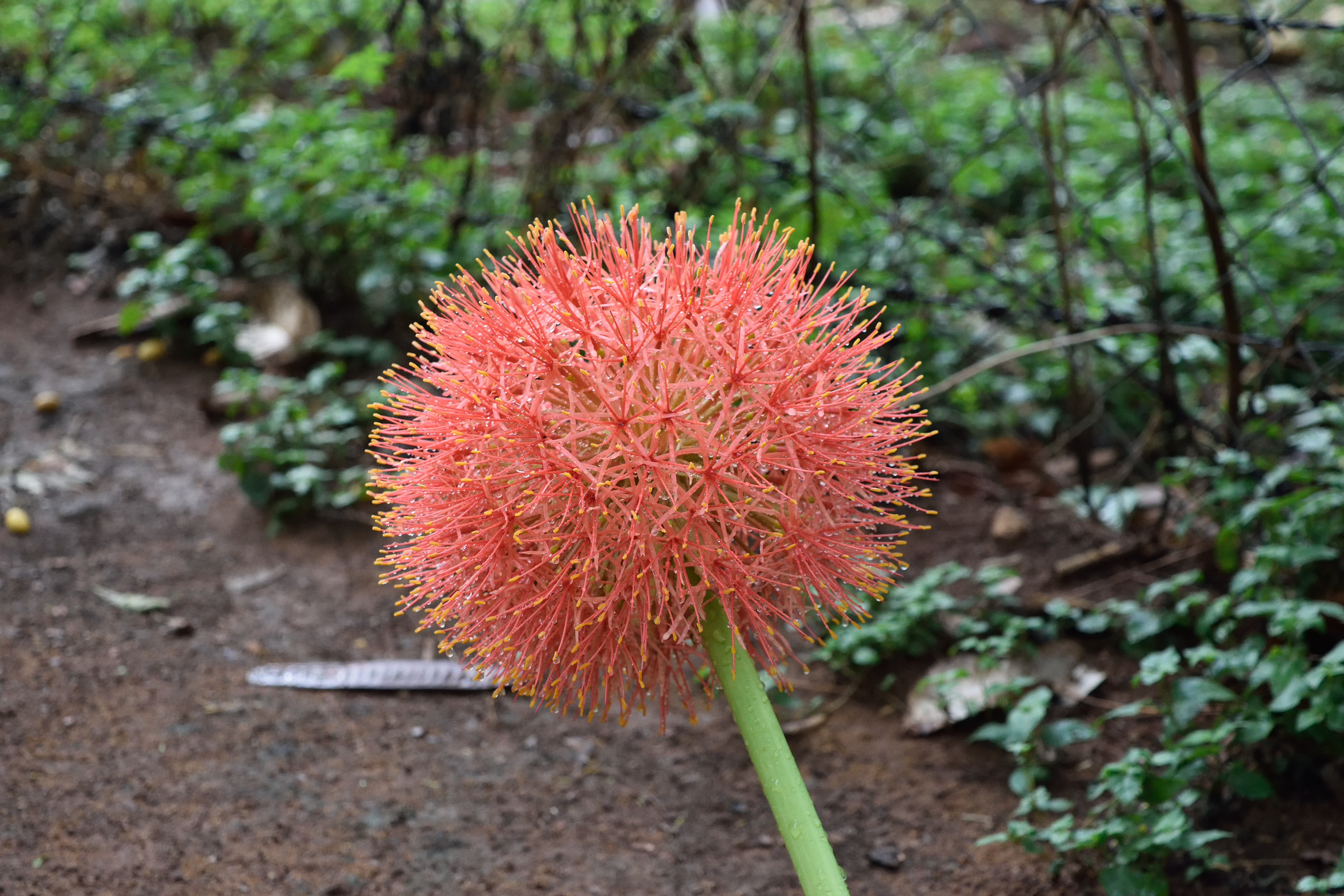
- Inflorescence of a blood lily in India

Scientific classification
- Kingdom: Plantae
- Clade: Tracheophytes
- Clade: Angiosperms
- Clade: Monocots
- Order: Asparagales
- Family: Amaryllidaceae
- Subfamily: Amaryllidoideae
- Genus: Scadoxus
- Species: S. multiflorus

Binomial name
- Scadoxus multiflorus (Martyn) Raf.

Synonyms
- List: Amaryllis multiflora (Martyn) Tratt.; Haemanthus abyssinicus Herb.; Haemanthus andrei De Wild.; Haemanthus arabicus M.Roem.; Haemanthus arnoldianus De Wild. & T.Durand; Haemanthus bequaertii De Wild.; Haemanthus bivalvis Beck; Haemanthus cecilae Baker; Haemanthus colchicifolius Salisb.; Haemanthus cruentatus Schumach. & Thonn.; Haemanthus delagoensis Herb.; Haemanthus eurysiphon Harms; Haemanthus filiflorus Baker ex Hiern; Haemanthus kalbreyeri Baker; Haemanthus katharinae Baker; Haemanthus longitubus C.H.Wright; Haemanthus lynesii Stapf; Haemanthus mannii Baker; Haemanthus micrantherus Pax; Haemanthus mildbraedii Perkins; Haemanthus multiflorus Martyn; Haemanthus nicholsonii Baker; Haemanthus otaviensis Dinter; Haemanthus rupestris Baker; Haemanthus sacculus E.Phillips; Haemanthus sacculus Phillips; Haemanthus seretii De Wild.; Haemanthus somaliensis Baker; Haemanthus tenuiflorus Herb. nom. illeg.; Haemanthus zambesiacus Baker; Nerissa multiflorus (Martyn) Salisb. nom. inval.

= Scadoxus multiflorus =

Blood lily

Species of flowering plant

Scadoxus multiflorus (formerly Haemanthus multiflorus) is a species of bulbous plant native to most of sub-Saharan Africa from Senegal to Somalia to South Africa. It is also native to Arabian Peninsula (Saudi Arabia, Yemen, Oman) and to the Seychelles. It is naturalized in Mexico and in the Chagos Archipelago. It is grown as an ornamental plant for its brilliantly coloured flowers, either in containers or in the ground in where the climate is suitable. There are three recognized subspecies. Strongly toxic like other Scadoxus species, it has been used as a component of arrow poisons and fishing poisons, as well as in traditional medicine. Common names, some of which are used for other species, include blood lily, ball lily, fireball lily, blood flower, Katherine-wheel, oxtongue lily, poison root and powderpuff lily.

== Description ==
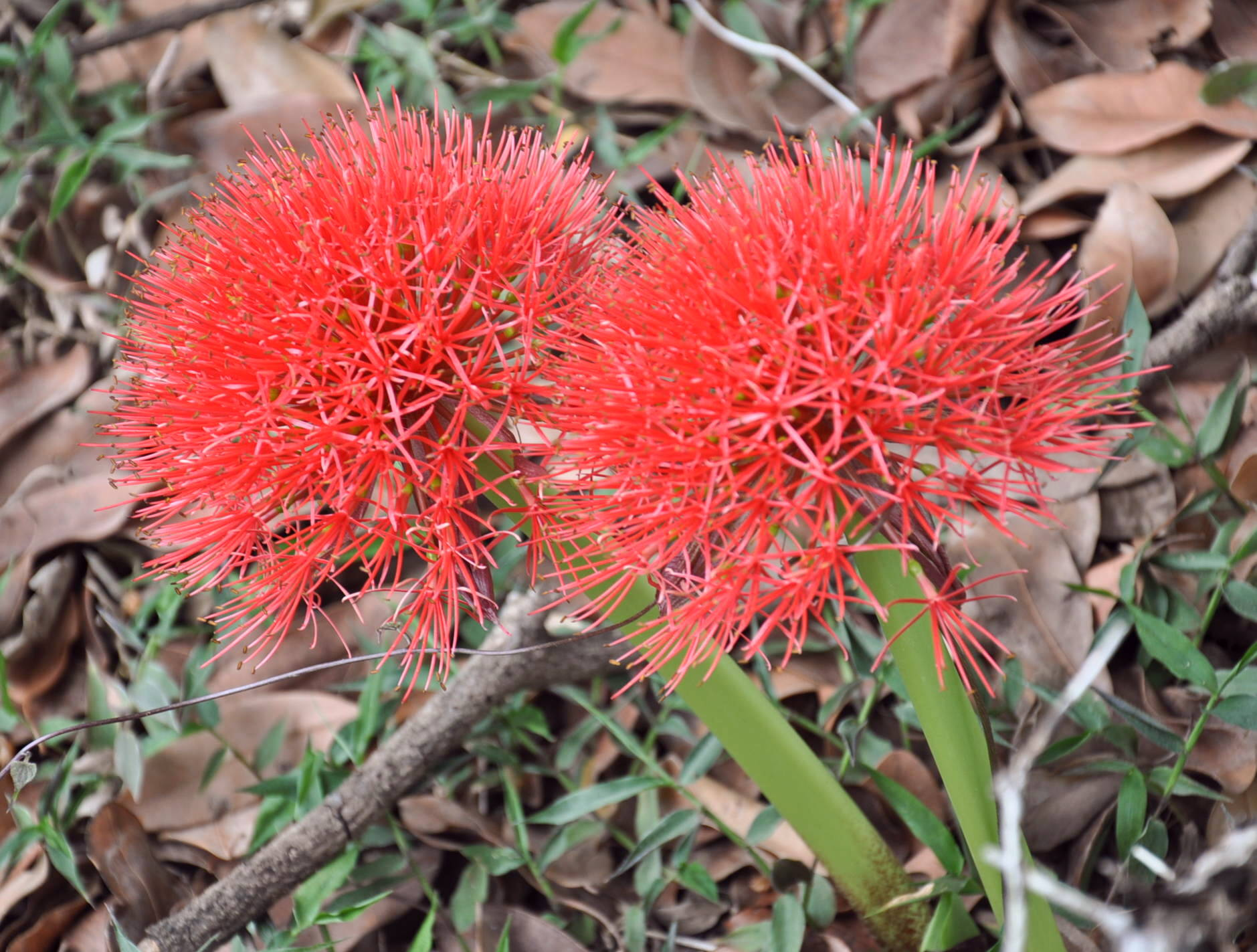
Scadoxus multiflorus subsp. multiflorus near Victoria Falls

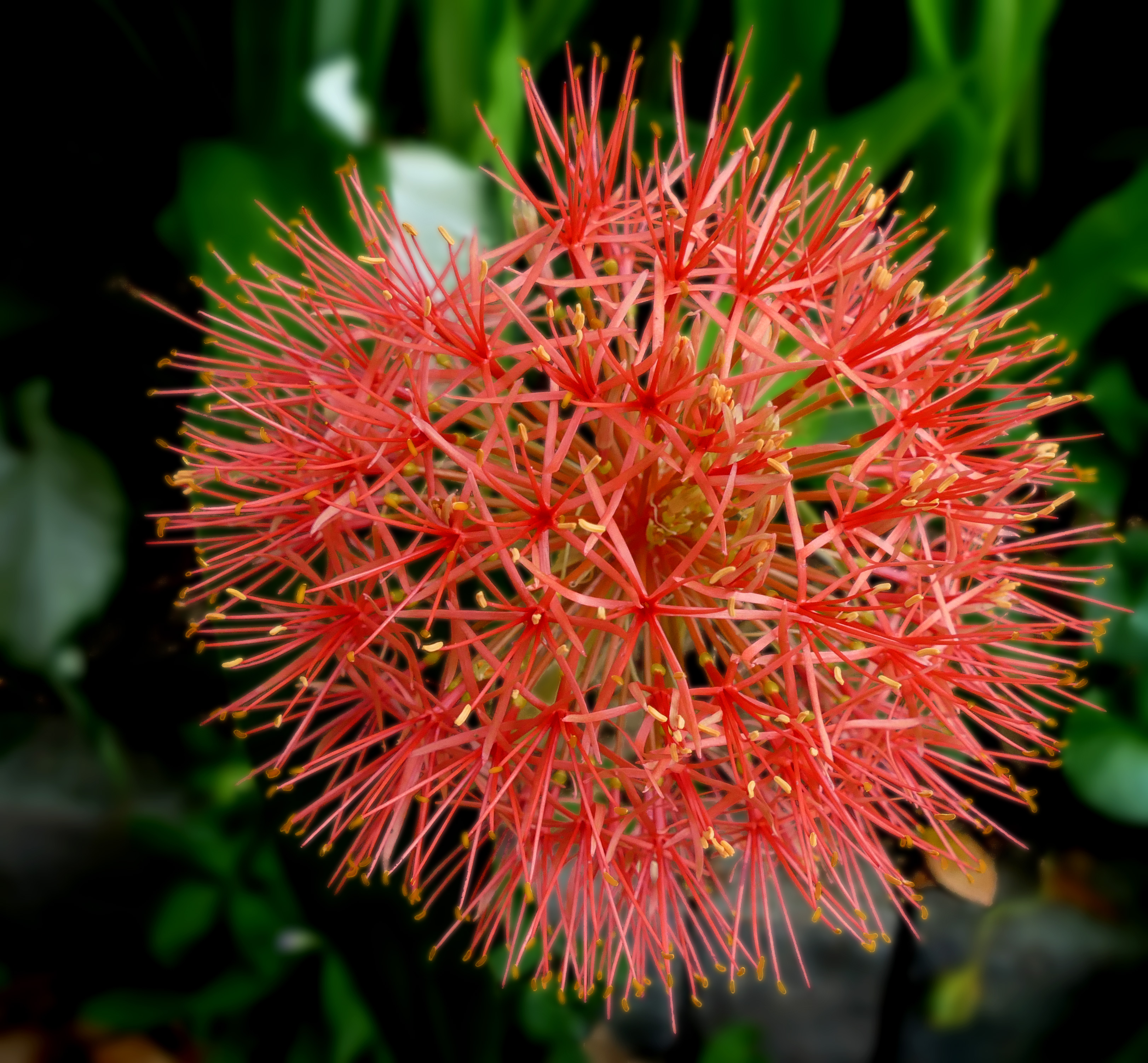

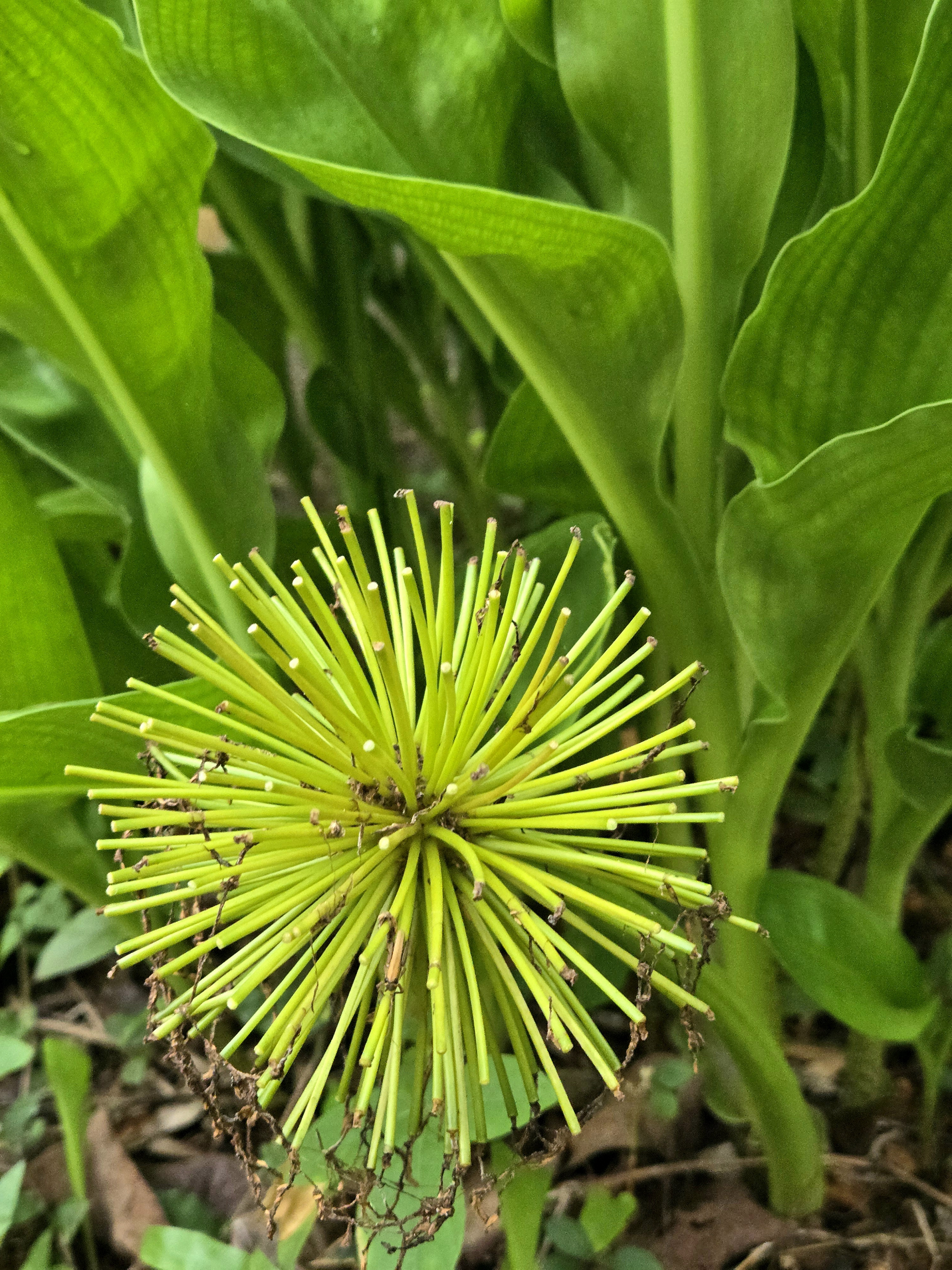
Tender seeds

Scadoxus multiflorus grows from a "rhizomatous bulb", i.e. a bulb which also produces rhizomes (modified underground stems). The leaves and flower may appear together or the leaves may be produced later. The bases of the leaves, the stalks or petioles, are tightly wrapped together to form a pseudostem or false stem, 5–60 cm (2–24 in) long. The flowers are produced in an umbel at the top of a leafless stem (scape), 12–75 cm (5–30 in) long. Both the pseudostem and the scape are often covered with reddish brown to dark violet spots. The bracts under the umbel soon wither.

The umbel of flowers is more-or-less globe shaped, with from 10 to 200 individual flowers. Each flower has a stalk (pedicel) typically 15–45 mm (0.6–1.8 in) long. The tepals, filaments of the stamens and the style are all scarlet, fading to pink. The bases of the tepals are fused to form a cylinder-shaped tube, 4–26 mm (0.2–1.0 in) long; the free ends of the tepals are 12–32 mm (0.5–1.3 in) long, narrow and spreading. The fruit is a berry, 5–10 mm (0.2–0.4 in) across.

Differences between the three accepted subspecies have been summarized by Friis and Nordal, and are shown in the table below.

Difference between subspecies
	S. m. subsp. multiflorus	S. m. subsp. katherinae	S. m. subsp. longitubus
Length of flower tube	4–15 mm	12–22 mm	15–26 mm
Length of free segments of the flower	12–32 mm	18–30 mm	15–28 mm
Width of free segments of the flower	0.5–2.5 mm	2.2–4 mm	1.4–3.4 mm
Height	Variable	Up to 120 cm	Up to 65 cm
Distribution	Southern to tropical Africa; Arabia	Swaziland; eastern coastal South Africa	Lowland forest in tropical west Africa

It can be seen that although the dimensions mostly overlap, the length of the flower tube relative to the free segments at the end of the flower distinguishes S. m. subsp. longitubus, in which they are more-or-less the same length, from S. m. subsp. multiflorus, in which the tube is generally shorter than the free segments. S. m. subsp. katherinae is intermediate. S. m. subsp. multiflorus tends to have narrower free segments than the other two subspecies. S. m. subsp. katherinae is tall, S. m. subsp. longitubus short, with S. m. subsp. multiflorus generally intermediate, although varying in height throughout its considerable range.

== Taxonomy ==
Scadoxus multiflorus was originally described by English botanist Thomas Martyn in 1795 as Haemanthus multiflorus. Constantine Samuel Rafinesque moved Haemanthus multiflorus to his new genus Scadoxus in 1838, giving it its current binomial name Scadoxus multiflorus. The separation of Scadoxus from Haemanthus was ignored by most workers until 1976, when the two genera were again segregated by Ib Friis and Inger Nordal. Haemanthus species are southern in distribution, form true bulbs and have 2n = 16 chromosomes, whereas Scadoxus species, such as S. multiflorus, are found throughout tropical Africa, do not all form bulbs and have 2n = 18 chromosomes. The leaves are a further distinguishing characteristic: those of Scadoxus are thinner and have a distinct stalk (petiole); those of Haemanthus are thicker and without a petiole.

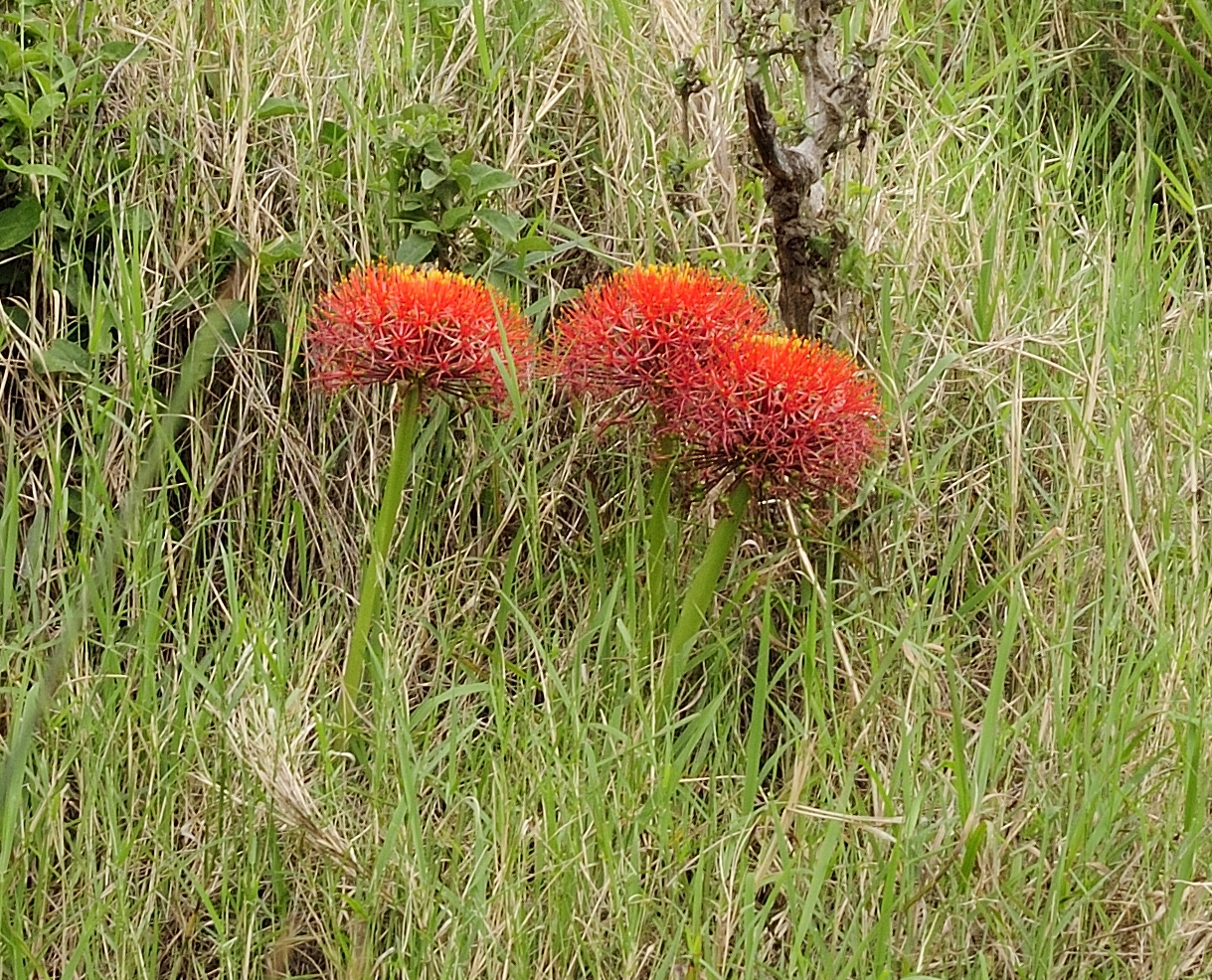
Scadoxus multiflorus subsp. multiflorus in Arusha National Park, Tanzania

=== Subspecies ===
Three subspecies are known:

- S. multiflorus ssp. katharinae (Baker) Friis & Nordal – Swaziland and eastern South Africa

Synonyms: Haemanthus katharinae Baker, Haemanthus multiflorus subsp. katharinae (Baker) I.Bjørnstad & Friis

- S. multiflorus ssp. longitubus (C.H.Wright) Friis & Nordal – west Africa

Synonyms: Haemanthus longitubus C.H.Wright, Haemanthus multiflorus subsp. longitubus (C.H.Wright) I.Bjørnstad & Friis, Haemanthus mannii Baker

- S. multiflorus ssp. multiflorus – tropical and southern Africa, the Arabian Peninsula

== Distribution and habitat ==
The species is native to tropical and southern Africa and parts of the Arabian Peninsula. The subspecies S. m. subsp. multiflorus is found throughout southern Africa. S. m. subsp. longitubus is found across tropical West and Central Africa, including in Cameroon, Ghana, Ivory Coast, Liberia, and Sierra Leone. S. m. subsp. katherinae is native to Mediterranean climate forest, scrub and woodland in eastern southern Africa – Cape Province and KwaZulu-Natal in South Africa and Swaziland. It is primarily a plant of moist, shady habitats, including savannah woodlands and forests along rivers and mountains.

== Cultivation ==
Scadoxus multiflorus is chill-sensitive and must be kept at a minimum temperature of 5 °C (41 °F), for forms of southern African origin, up to 10 °C (50 °F) or more for those of tropical origin. An open, well-drained growing medium, largely organic in nature, is recommended. Propagation is by seed. Pests are those of Scadoxus generally.

Scadoxus multiflorus subsp. longitubus is rarely if ever cultivated, although (under the synonym Haemanthus mannii) it was described as having been "introduced" in 1877. Scadoxus multiflorus subsp. multiflorus is produced for sale in large numbers by the Dutch horticultural industry. In cultivated forms, the flowers often appear before the leaves, sometimes not until late summer.

Scadoxus multiflorus subsp. katherinae has been described as "imposing", sometimes reaching a height of 120 cm (4 ft), with a strong purple-spotted pseudostem. Red berries may be produced, which can last through the winter. The UK National Plant Collection for Scadoxus has described it as "an excellent plant for a glasshouse or sunny windowsill." In South Africa it can be grown in the open garden in the shade, in well-drained, light soil containing plenty of organic matter. It requires ample water when in growth but must have good drainage when dormant. It will grow under trees provided the soil is sufficiently fertile.

=== Cultivars ===
Some artificial hybrids between S. multiflorus subsp. katherinae and S. puniceus are known. Johannes Nicolai raised S. 'König Albert' which flowered for the first time in 1899. Although rare in cultivation, it multiplies rapidly. Of the same parentage is S. 'Andromeda', raised by C. G. van Tubergen around 1904.

Scadoxus multiflorus subsp. katherinae has received the Royal Horticultural Society's Award of Garden Merit.

== Toxicity and uses ==
The genus Scadoxus has some strongly toxic species, containing poisonous alkaloids lethal to animals, such as sheep and goats, that graze on the leaves or bulbs. Scadoxus multiflorus is traditionally used in parts of tropical Africa as a component of arrow poisons and fishing poisons. It is also used in traditional medicine, although in South Africa less so than Scadoxus puniceus.
