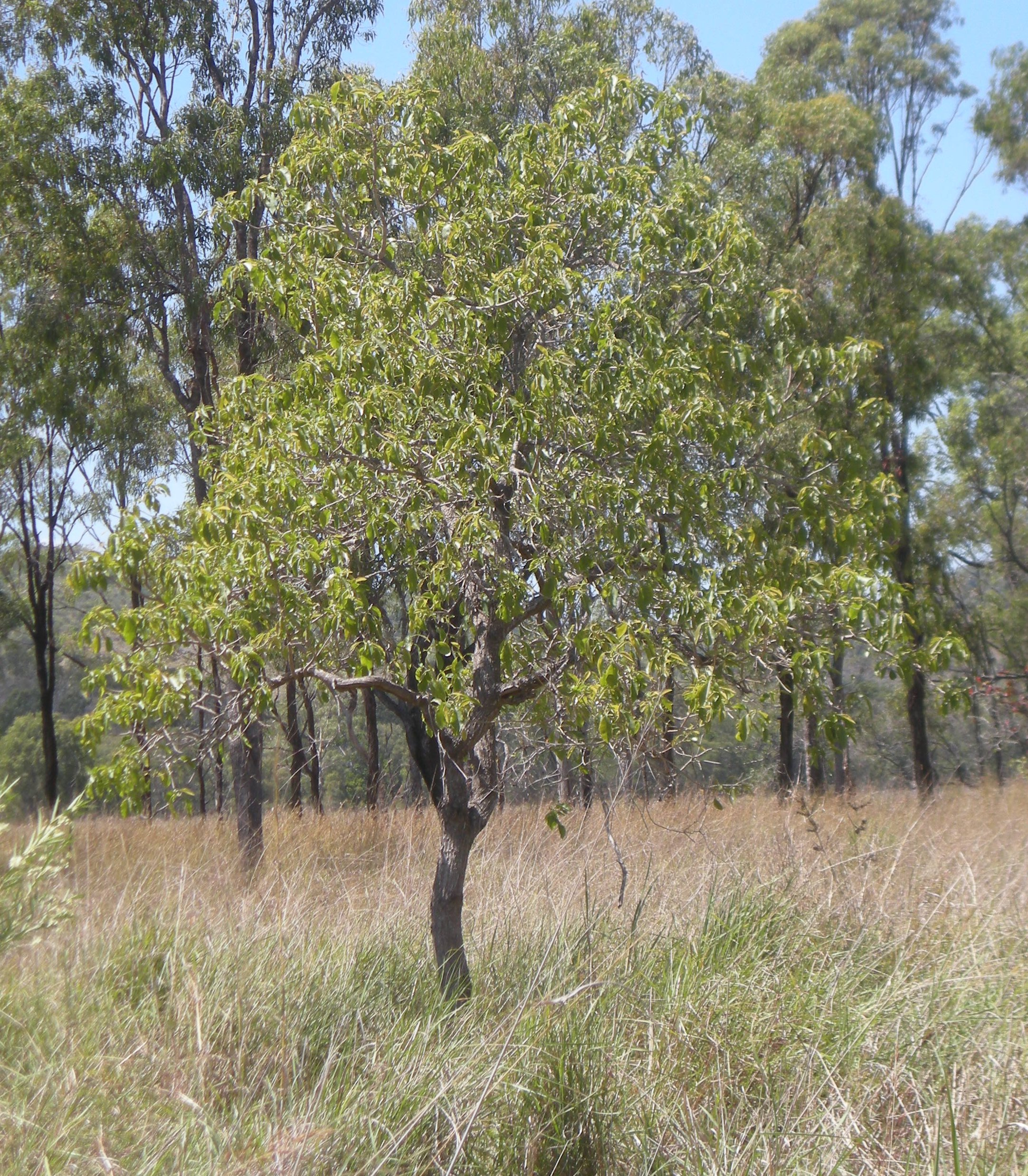

Conservation status
- Least Concern (IUCN 3.1)

Scientific classification
- Kingdom: Plantae
- Clade: Tracheophytes
- Clade: Angiosperms
- Clade: Eudicots
- Clade: Asterids
- Order: Ericales
- Family: Lecythidaceae
- Genus: Planchonia
- Species: P. careya

Binomial name
- Planchonia careya (F.Muell.) R.Knuth

Synonyms
- Barringtonia careya F.Muell.; Careya australis F.Muell.

= Planchonia careya =

Species of plant

Planchonia careya is a tree species in the family Lecythidaceae. Common names include cocky apple, cockatoo apple and billygoat plum. The species should not be confused with Terminalia ferdinandiana, with which it shares some common names. The 1889 book 'The Useful Native Plants of Australia' records that Indigenous Australians of the Mitchell River area referred to this plant as "Ootcho" while those of the Cloncurry River area referred to it as "Go-onje" and "Gunthamarrah".

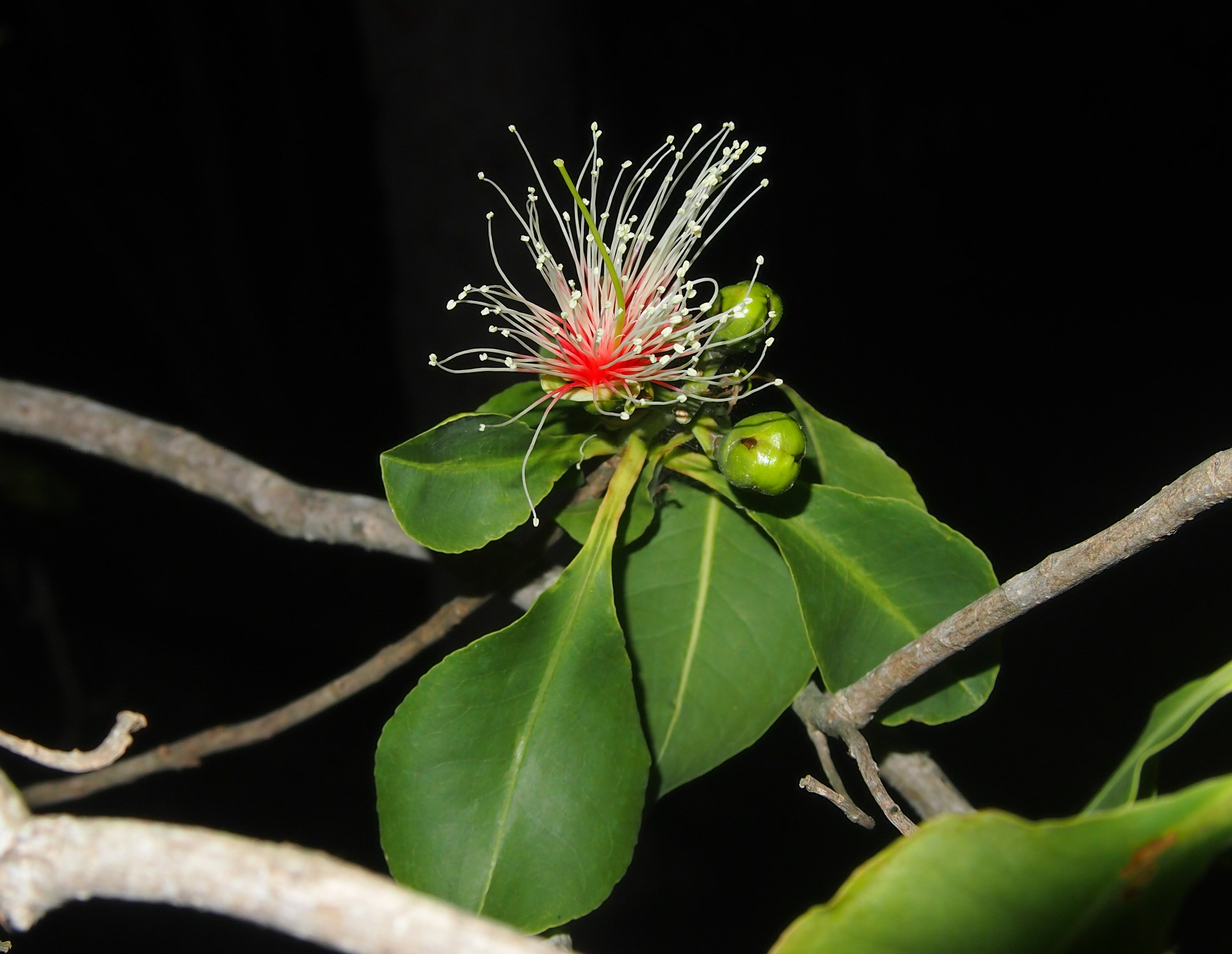
Flower

== Uses ==
Indigenous Australians consumed the raw ripe fruit of this species. The taste is stated to be similar to quince.

Indigenous Australians pulverized the inner bark of this species and added it to small water bodies to act as a fish toxin, allowing fish to be easily collected from the surface of the water. This is known to have been a practice used by Indigenous Australians at Cleveland Bay. The roots of the species were also used as a fish toxin by Indigenous Australians.

Indigenous Australians boiled the inner bark of this species in water and the resulting liquid was used as an antiseptic wash for open cuts and sores.

Indigenous Australians placed the heated leaves of this species over mosquito and sandfly bites to relieve irritation.

Indigenous Australians used the flowers of this species as decorations.
