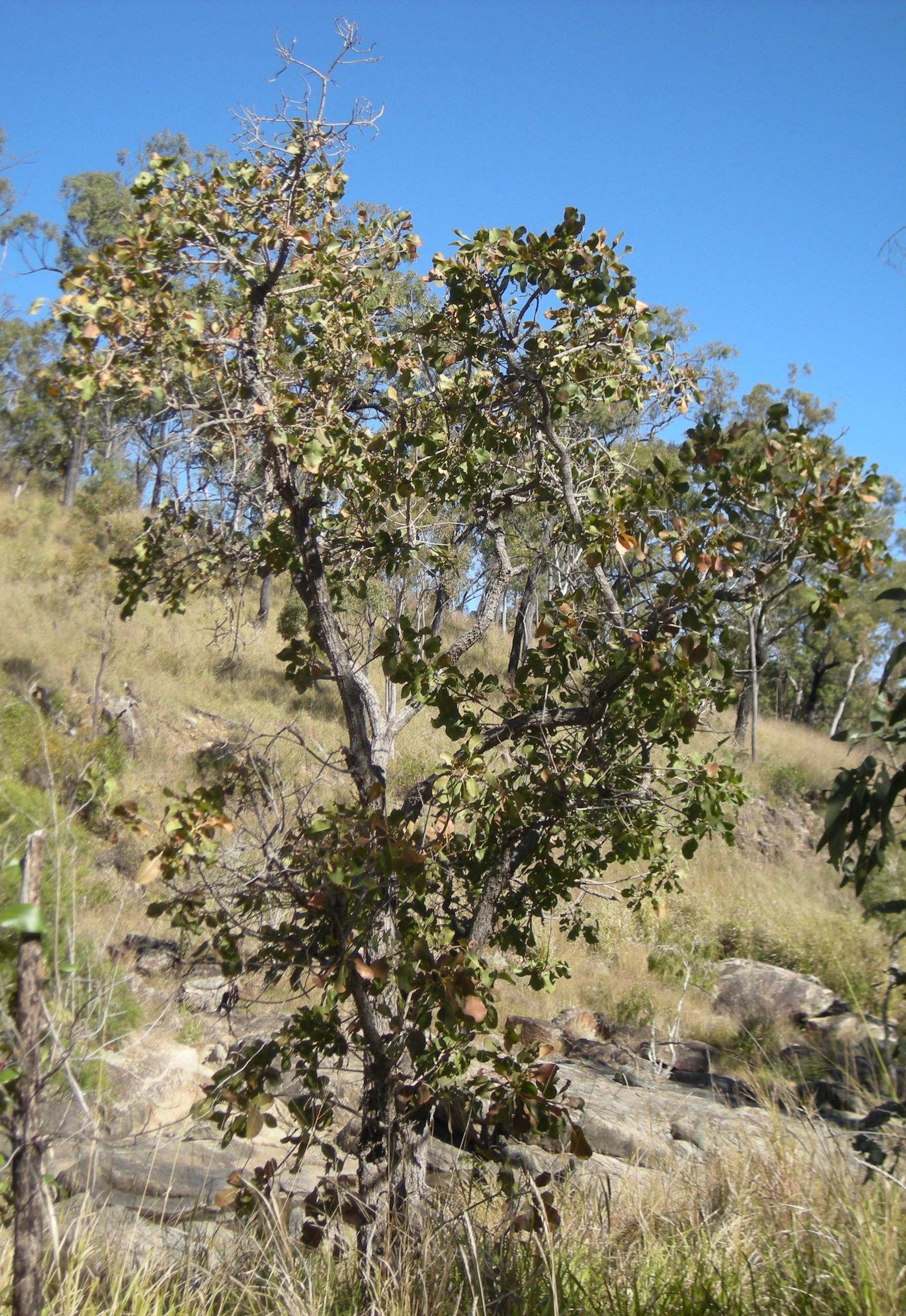
- Planchonia careya in Mount Archer National Park in Queensland

Scientific classification
- Kingdom: Plantae
- Clade: Tracheophytes
- Clade: Angiosperms
- Clade: Eudicots
- Clade: Asterids
- Order: Ericales
- Family: Lecythidaceae
- Genus: Planchonia; Blume

Type species
- Planchonia timorensis Blume

= Planchonia =

Genus of flowering plants

Planchonia is a genus of trees and shrubs in the family Lecythidaceae first described as a genus in 1851. It is native to Southeast Asia, Papuasia, and Australia.

== Species ==
As of June 2025, Plants of the World Online accepts the following 9 species:

- Planchonia andamanica King – Andaman Islands
- Planchonia brevistipitata Kuswata – Borneo
- Planchonia careya (F.Muell.) R.Knuth – New Guinea, Queensland, Northern Territory, Western Australia
- Planchonia grandis Ridl. – Borneo, Malaya, Sumatra, Thailand
- Planchonia papuana R.Knuth – New Guinea, Solomon Islands
- Planchonia rupestris R.L.Barrett & M.D.Barrett – Western Australia
- Planchonia spectabilis Merr. – Philippines
- Planchonia timorensis Blume – Lesser Sunda Islands
- Planchonia valida (Blume) Blume – Borneo, Java, Lesser Sunda Islands, Malaya, Sulawesi, Sumatra, Thailand
