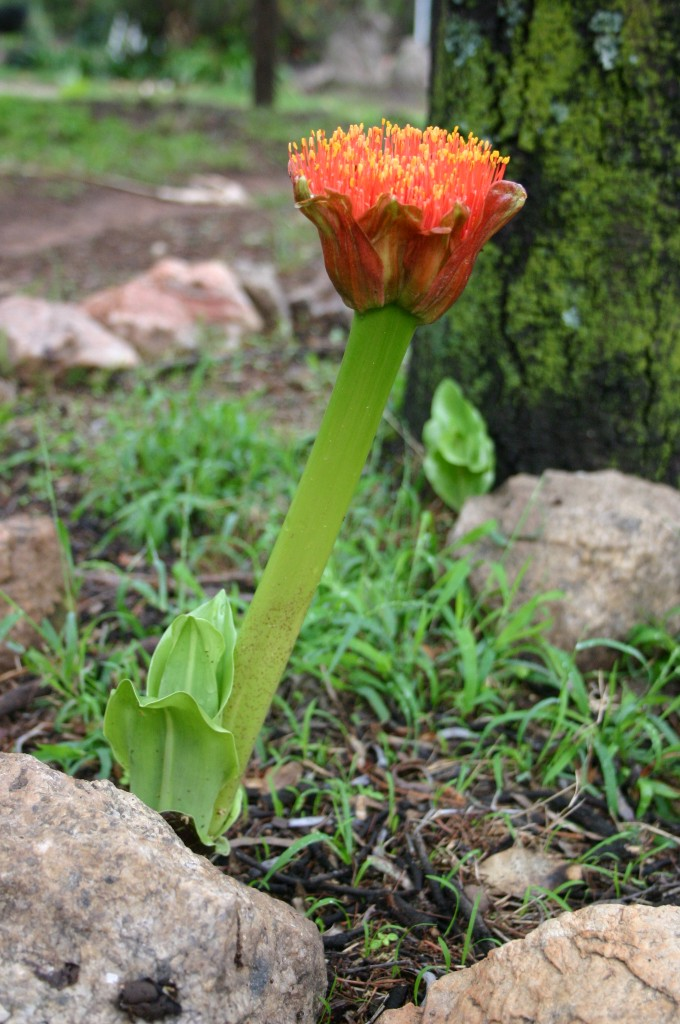
- Scadoxus puniceus

Scientific classification
- Kingdom: Plantae
- Clade: Tracheophytes
- Clade: Angiosperms
- Clade: Monocots
- Order: Asparagales
- Family: Amaryllidaceae
- Subfamily: Amaryllidoideae
- Genus: Scadoxus
- Species: S. puniceus

Binomial name
- Scadoxus puniceus (L.) I.Friis & I.Nordal

= Scadoxus puniceus =

Paintbrush lily

Species of flowering plant

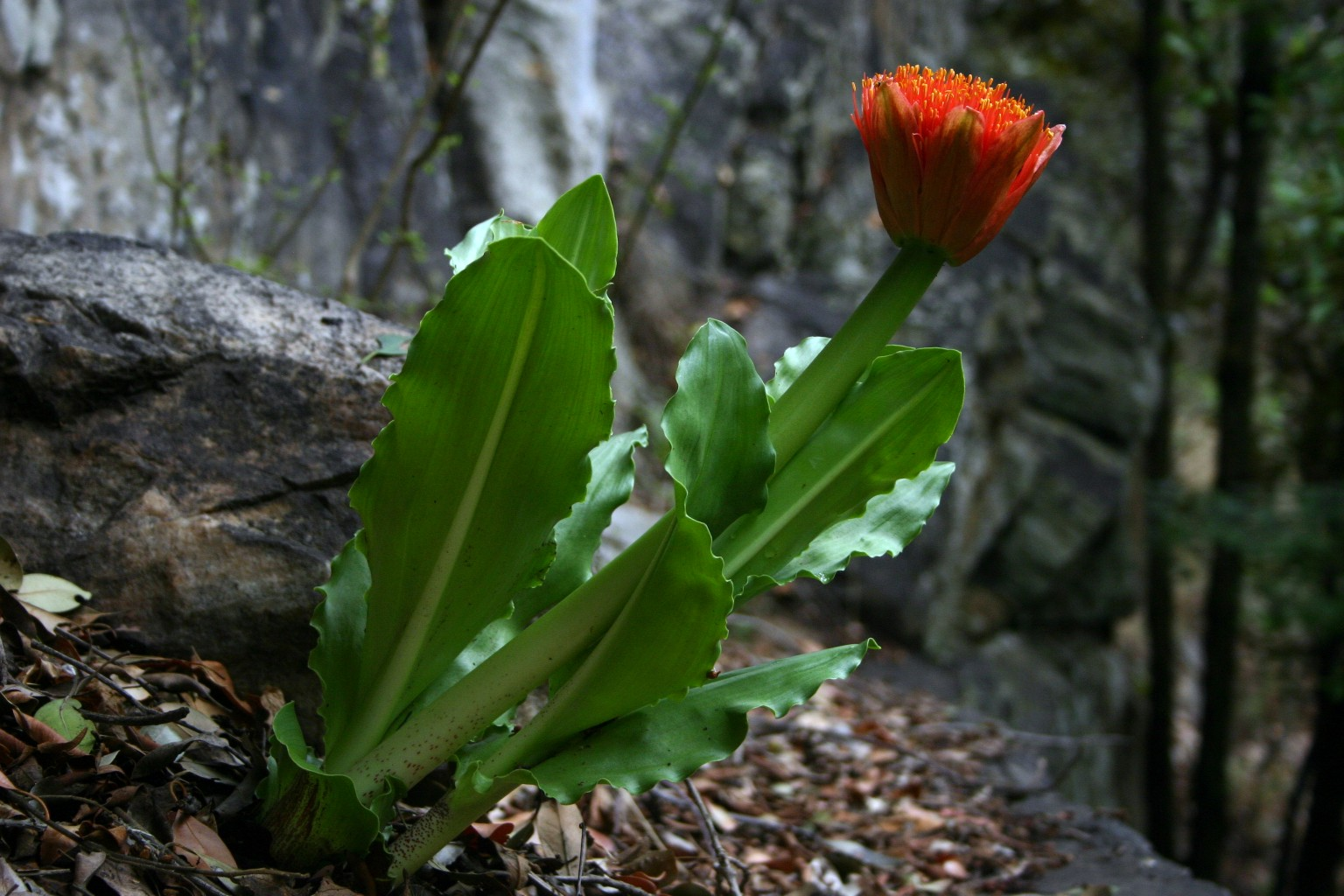
In Magaliesberg

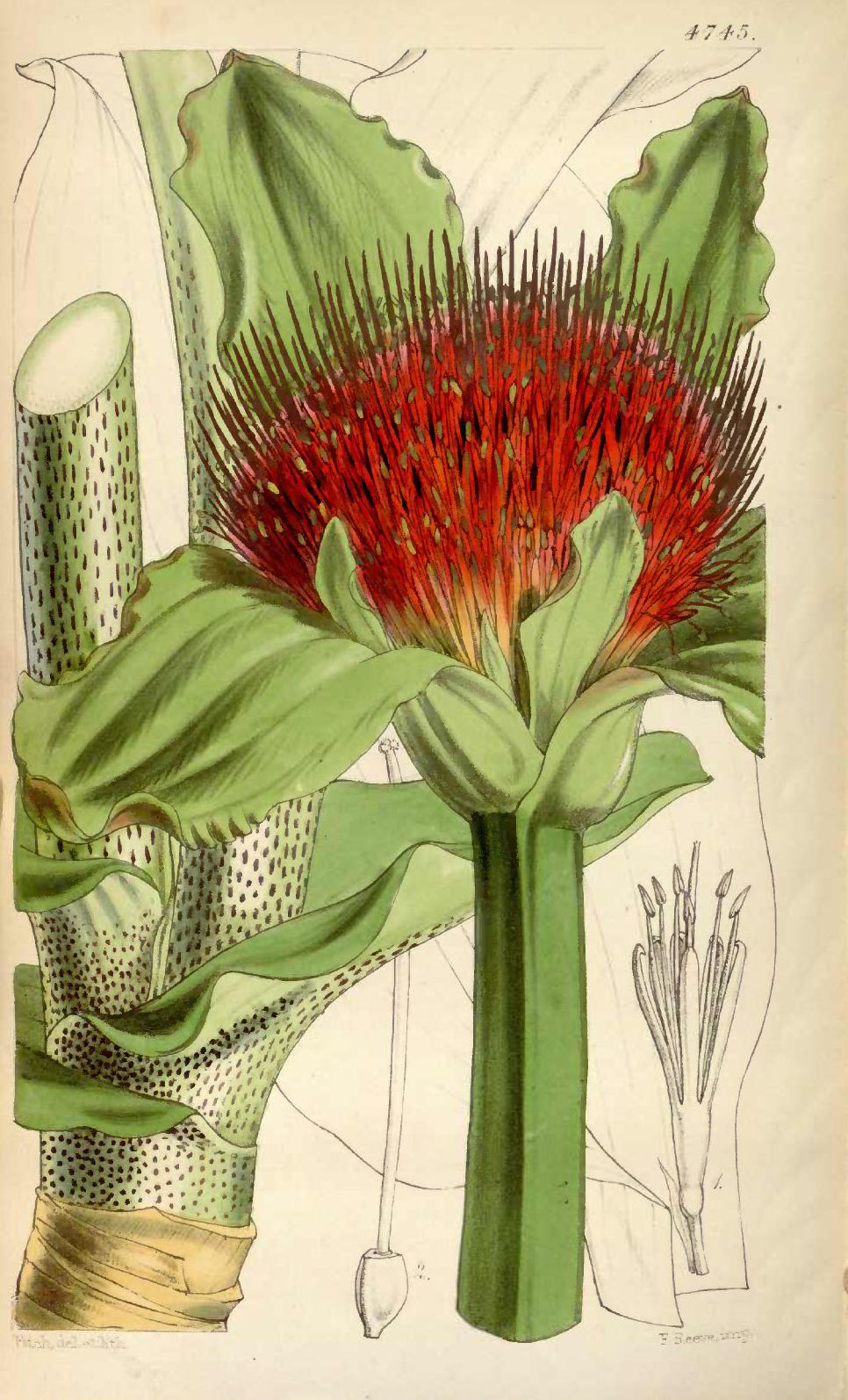
Plate by Walter Hood Fitch in Curtis' Botanical Magazine

Scadoxus puniceus, commonly known as the paintbrush lily, is a species of bulbous plant. It is native to much of southern and eastern Africa: Ethiopia, Sudan, Tanzania, Malawi, Mozambique, Zambia, Zimbabwe, Botswana, Eswatini (Swaziland), and South Africa (the Cape Provinces, KwaZulu-Natal, the Free State and the Northern Provinces). Scadoxus puniceus can be found in cool, shady habitat such as ravines and forests, where it is often found in moist leaf litter. Other common names include snake lily, royal paintbrush, King-of-Candida, African blood lily (English), rooikwas (Afrikaans), isisphompho, and umgola (Zulu). There are nine species of Scadoxus of which three, S. puniceus, S. multiflorus (with 2 subspecies) and S.membranaceus, occur in South Africa.

== Description ==
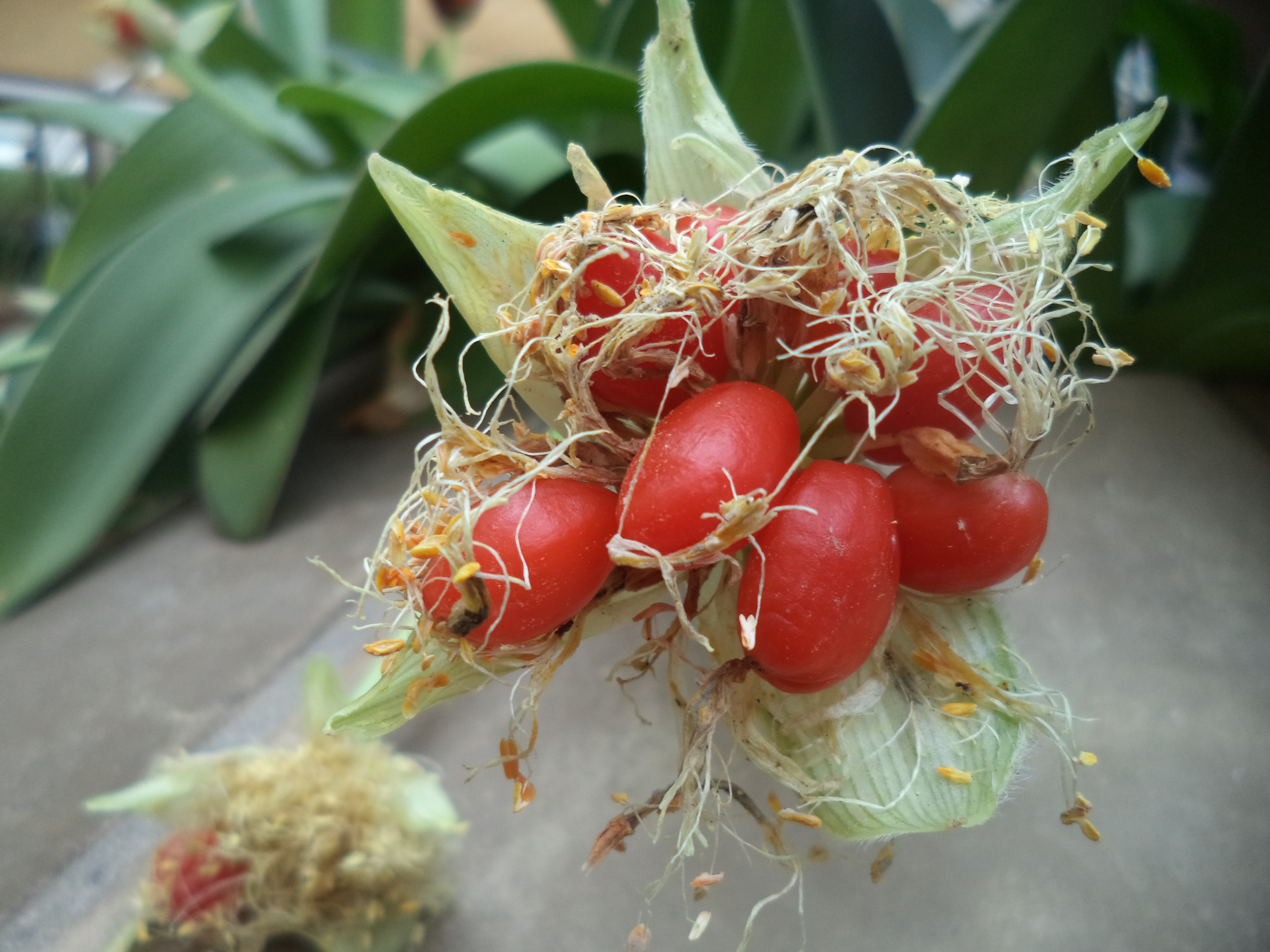
Ripened fruits

The bright red, round fruits are about a centimeter wide, and each produces a single opalescent seed.

== Taxonomy ==
The genus was named by the polymath Constantine Samuel Rafinesque, who did not explain its etymology. The name is possibly from doxus meaning "glory" or "splendour" in Ancient Greek, referring to the scarlet flowers; the prefix sca means "obscure" or "hidden", or from the Greek "skia" = shade. One source reports the origin of the name to be unclear. The species name puniceus means "reddish-purple". Previously classified as part of Haemanthus, it was separated mainly because of its stalked leaves.

=== Synonyms ===
- Gyaxis puniceus (L.) Salisb.
- Haemanthus fax-imperii Cufod.
- Haemanthus goetzei Harms
- Haemanthus insignis Hook.
- Haemanthus magnificus (Herb.) Herb.
- Haemanthus natalensis Hook.
- Haemanthus orchidifolius Salisb.
- Haemanthus puniceus L.
- Haemanthus puniceus var. fortuita Herb.
- Haemanthus puniceus var. magnificus Herb.
- Haemanthus redouteanus M.Roem.
- Haemanthus redouteanus var. subalbus M.Roem.
- Haemanthus rouperi auct.
- Haemanthus superbus Baker

== Cultivation ==
The plant is cultivated as an ornamental. It was popular in the Netherlands as early as the beginning of the 18th century.

=== Cultivars ===
Some artificial hybrids between Scadoxus puniceus and S. multiflorus subsp. katherinae are known. Johannes Nicolai raised S. 'König Albert', which flowered for the first time in 1899. Although rare in cultivation, it multiplies rapidly. Of the same parentage is S. 'Andromeda', which was raised by C. G. van Tubergen around 1904.

== Uses ==
While the bulb is considered poisonous in significant amounts, it is used traditionally to treat "coughs, gastro-intestinal problems, febrile colds, asthma, leprosy, sprains and bruises," and "as an antidote to poisons.'" It is also used as a diuretic. The leaves are applied to sores and ulcers to aid healing and act as an antiseptic. The plant is also traditionally consumed during pregnancy as part of an herbal regime to ensure safe labour. The alkaloids in the plant include haemanthamines, haemanthidine, 6-β-hydroxycrinamine, scapunine, and scadoxucines.
