= National Plant Collection =

UK horticultural conservation scheme

A National Plant Collection is a registered and documented collection of a group of cultivated plants in the United Kingdom. National Plant Collections are part of a plant conservation scheme run by Plant Heritage, a registered charity which aims to protect and develop the biological and heritage resource of plants in UK gardens.

Participating individuals or organisations undertake to collect and conserve living material of a particular group of plants, as well as research its history and cultivation. Collection holders must be members of Plant Heritage, and agree to stringent requirements for labelling, documentation, and propagation of the collection. They may be individuals, botanic gardens, plant nurseries, local authority parks, or groups of people holding distributed collections.

Some collections are composed of a taxonomic group, such as a single genus or species. Others are defined by a horticultural group, such as cultivars with particular foliage characteristics or plants collected by a certain historical figure. There may be multiple collections covering the same plant group, which reduces the risk of rare plants being lost from extreme climatic events.

As of October 2023, there are over 700 collections comprising a total of over 95,000 plants.

== See also ==
- National Fruit Collection
- Heirloom plant
- Seed library
