= Fish toxins =

Plant derivatives that are poisonous to fish

Fish toxins or fish stupefying plants have historically been used by many hunter gatherer cultures to stun fish, so they become easy to collect by hand. Some of these toxins paralyse fish, which can then be easily collected. The process of documenting many fish toxins and their use is ongoing, with interest in potential uses from medicine, agriculture, and industry.

== Theory ==
Use of the herbal fish poisons has been documented in a number of sources involving catching fish from fresh and sea water.

Tribal people historically used various plants for medicinal and food exploitation purposes. Use of fish poisons is a very old practice in the history of humankind. In 1212 AD, King Frederick II prohibited the use of certain plant piscicides, and by the 15th century, similar laws had been decreed in other European countries, as well. All over the globe, indigenous people use various fish poisons to kill fish, including America and among Tarahumara Indians.

Herbal fish-stupefying agents are proven means of fishing. Many of these plants have been used for a long time by local people, and have been tested and found to have medicinal properties, such as Careya arborea, which is used as analgesic and antidiarrheal. Some of the plants, such as C. collinus, are traditional poisons used in the different part of the country. Bark extracts of Lannea coromandelica caused lysis of cell membranes followed by fragmentation of cellular materials.

== Example plants ==
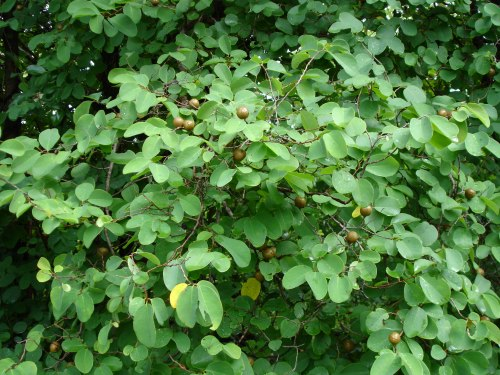
The fish poison plant Oduku (Cleistanthus collinus, family Phyllanthaceae) in fruit

- In Africa, the closely related families of Caesalpiniaceae, Mimosaceae, and Papilionaceae, and a large number of Euphorbiaceae account for most fish poisons.
- California buckeye (Aesculus californica) is a widespread tree in the California oak woodlands and chaparral. The large orange-colored fruit is leached in warm water, with the resultant aesculin mixture then applied to pools in slow-moving streams to stun fish.
- Many of California's Native American tribes traditionally used the soaproot species, Chlorogalum pomeridianum, which contains saponin, as a fish poison. They would pulverize the roots, mix in water to create a foam, and then add the suds to a stream. This would kill or incapacitate the fish, which could be gathered easily from the surface of the water. The Lassik, Luiseño, Yuki, Yokuts, Chilula, Wailaki, Miwok, Kato, Mattole, Nomlaki, and Nishinam tribes used this technique.
- California Natives also used crushed leaves of Croton setiger as a fish toxin much like soaproot and passed this technique on to later immigrants.
- Indigenous peoples of the Southeastern Woodlands engaged in fish poisoning, trapping fish with dams or weirs before deploying incapacitating poisons. Several of the toxic plants utilized include crushed black walnut (Juglans nigra), horse chestnut (Aesculus hippocastanum), and Viburnum. Members of the Eastern Band of Cherokee Indians have fished with poison into the 20th century.
- The extremely toxic (to humans), tropane alkaloid-containing shrub Latua pubiflora (family Solanaceae) was used formerly by the Huilliche people of the Los Lagos Region of southern Chile to catch fish in slow-flowing rivers - either alone or in combination with the juice of Drimys winteri (Winteraceae) - the latter being a fish poison in its own right. The poison did not kill the fish outright, but merely made them torpid enough to be caught easily.
- Olax in the family Olacaceae is a climber with compound, dark-green leaves and white bark. This is the most extensively used fish poison among the Gondi of India. Typically in summer, the leaves of this plant are dried and powdered. About 1 kg of powder is mixed into water about 5 ft (1.5 m) deep in ponds, usually in the summer. Fish are stunned by the poison and rise to the surface, where they are easily collected by hand. If stunned fish are immediately reintroduced into clean water, they become active. To get good results from the Olax (or korkat), the temperature needs to be high.
- Strychnos lucida in the family Loganiaceae was used by Indigenous Australians as a fish toxin.
- Acacia auriculiformis, Acacia holosericea, Tephrosia phaeosperma and Tephrosia polyzyga in the family Fabaceae were used by Indigenous Australians as fish toxins.
- Owenia vernicosa in the family Meliaceae was used by Indigenous Australians as a fish toxin.
- Atalaya hemiglauca in the family Sapindaceae was used by Indigenous Australians as a fish toxin.
- Barringtonia acutangula and Planchonia careya in the family Lecythidaceae were used by Indigenous Australians as fish toxins.
- Careya arborea in the family Lecythidaceae is a large deciduous tree with simple large obovate leaves, large fruit and dark gray bark found in parts of Asia. The root bark is crushed and mixed in water. Upon its admixture, water blackens.
- Cleistanthus collinus in the family Euphorbiaceae (odcha in Gondi) is a medium-sized tree mainly found around villages in Sri Lanka. Young tender shoots of this species are used for fish stunning. The shoots are crushed with water on a stone, and a paste is mixed into the water.
- Lannea coromandelica in the family Anacardiaceae is a medium-sized to large deciduous tree with a spreading crown and stout branches. The leaves are compound, the bark is whitish or gray, and it has small, yellowish or purplish flowers. Flowers and fruits appear between February and June. Fruits (red, compressed, reniform, and single-seeded) of this plant are crushed and mixed in water. It is abundant in the Mendha-Lekha forest of Maharashtra.
- Costus speciosus in the family Costaceae is an erect, succulent herb, up to 2.7 m tall and with a tuberous rootstock, which is crushed and mixed in water for fish stunning in India. Apart from its use as a fish stunning agent in Mendha, tubers of bese mati are consumed after boiling.
- Madhuca indica in the family Sapotaceae is a large tree, with seeds yielding edible oil. After the removal of the oil from seeds, the remaining cake is used for fish stunning in India. This cake is locally known as gara-dhep. The cake is boiled in water and mixed into water. A 0.5-kg cake is sufficient for a 100 ft^{2} pond. It is an effective agent, but fish usually die from its application.
- Nauclea orientalis is a large tree in the family Rubiaceae found in Southeast Asia and Australasia. It is commonly known as the Leichhardt tree. The bark is used in creating fish poison.
- Pterocarpus marsupium in the family Fabaceae is a large tree with simple leaves found in South Asia and Nepal. Its gray bark is used for fish poisoning, crushed and mixed in water.
- Verbascum thapsus, a widespread introduced species from Europe, contains rotenone in its leaves and seeds and has been used for fish poisoning.

== See also ==
- Cyanide fishing
- Rotenone
