= Ib Friis =

- Born: 1945 (age 80–81)
- Scientific career
- Fields: Botany
- Author abbrev. (botany): Friis

Ib Friis (born 1945) is a Danish professor of botany at the Natural History Museum of Denmark, University of Copenhagen.

== Career ==
Friis has mainly studied the taxonomy of tropical Urticaceae and related families, flora and vegetation of Africa south of the Sahara, with special experience in the flora and vegetation in Horn of Africa, botanical nomenclature and the history of exploration of the plant world of the tropics.

Friis is a member of the Royal Danish Academy of Sciences and Letters.
