= Inger Nordal =

Norwegian professor of botany (1944–2026)

Inger Nordal (also Inger Bjørnstad)
- Born: 11 August 1944
- Died: 18 October 2026 (aged 82)
- Scientific career
- Fields: Botany
- Author abbrev. (botany): I.Bjørnstad, Nordal

Inger Nordal (11 August 1944 – 18 October 2026) was a Norwegian professor of botany.

== Life and career ==
Nordal was an associate professor at the University of Oslo from 1974, took the fil.dr. degree (doctorate) at Uppsala University in 1977 and became a professor in 1987. In 1990 she was admitted into the Norwegian Academy of Science and Letters. A few of her early papers were published under her then married name "Inger Nordal Bjørnstad".

She was also elected as a member of Bærum municipal council for the term 1979–1983, representing the Socialist Left Party. She resided at Østerås.

Nordal died on 18 October 2026, at the age of 82.

== Authority names ==
Nordal is known historically in the scientific literature under two different reference names, the latter Nordal being the current form.
