= Cooperia (plant) =

Extinct genus of flowering plants

Cooperia was a genus of tender herbaceous perennials native to South America and the southern reaches of North America. Along with the former genus Habranthus, Cooperia is now included in a more broadly circumscribed genus Zephyranthes, a member of the amaryllis family, Amaryllidaceae. All three genera were commonly known as rain lilies because of their propensity for blooming after rains. Species formerly placed in Cooperia bloom in summer and fall.

Although Cooperia was considered distinguishable from the better known rain lily genus, Zephyranthes, by its fragrance similar to primroses, its white or yellow pollen, its tolerance for drout and desert conditions (Howard 2001:54) and tendency to be night-blooming (Ogden 1994:11), it is now considered to be part of Zephyranthes and the genus name Cooperia is no longer accepted.

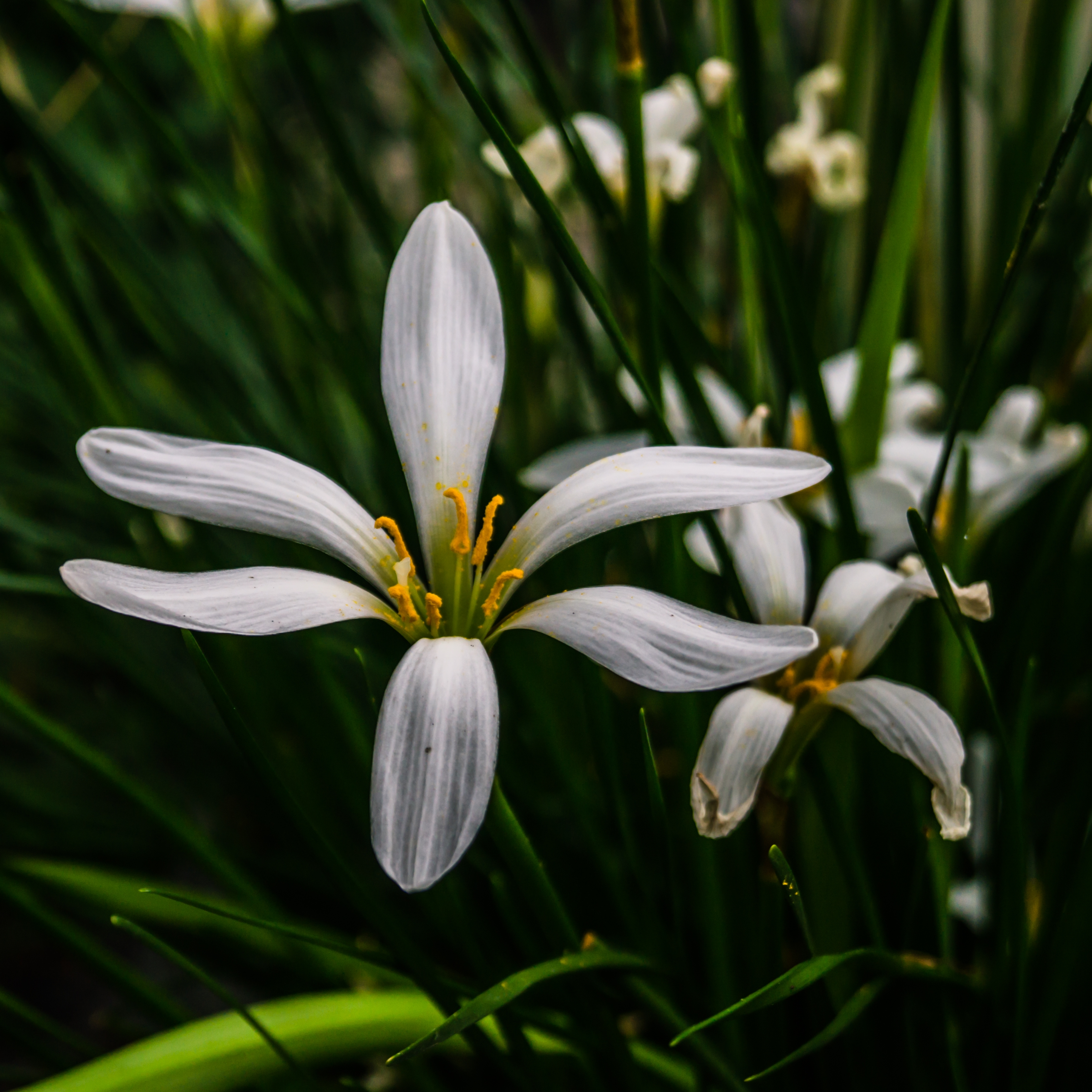
Zephyranthes drummondii, formerly Cooperia pedunculata

== Cultivation ==
Hybrids have been successfully created with species then placed in separate genera Zephyranthes (× Cooperanthes) and Habranthus (× Cooperanthus) (Ogden 1994:11, Howard 2001:54). All are now within Zephyranthes.

== See also ==
- List of plants known as lily

== Bibliography ==
- Fellers, John D. "A Passion for Rainlilies: Cooperia, Habranthus, and Zephyranthes." Herbertia v51, 1996, pp 78–112.
- Howard, Thad M. Bulbs for Warm Climates. Austin, TX: University of Texas Press, 2001, pp 53; 54-56.
- Ogden, Scott. Garden Bulbs for the South. Dallas, TX: Taylor Publishing Co., 1994, pp 5–27.
- WCSP (2016). "World Checklist of Selected Plant Families: Cooperia". The Board of Trustees of the Royal Botanic Gardens, Kew.
- GRIN (2016). "GRIN Taxonomy for Plants". Germplasm Resources Information Network.
