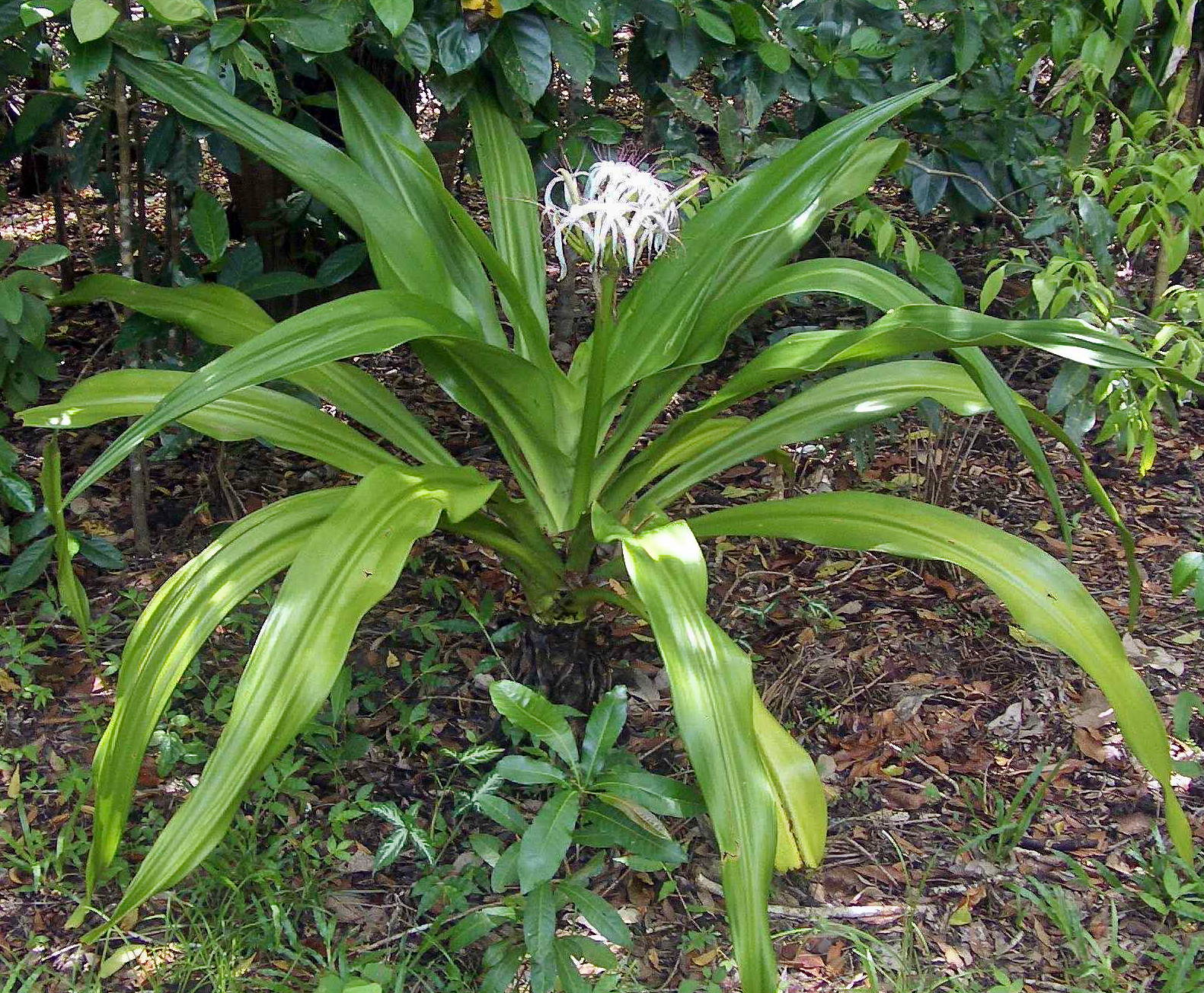
- Crinum pedunculatum in Cooktown, Australia
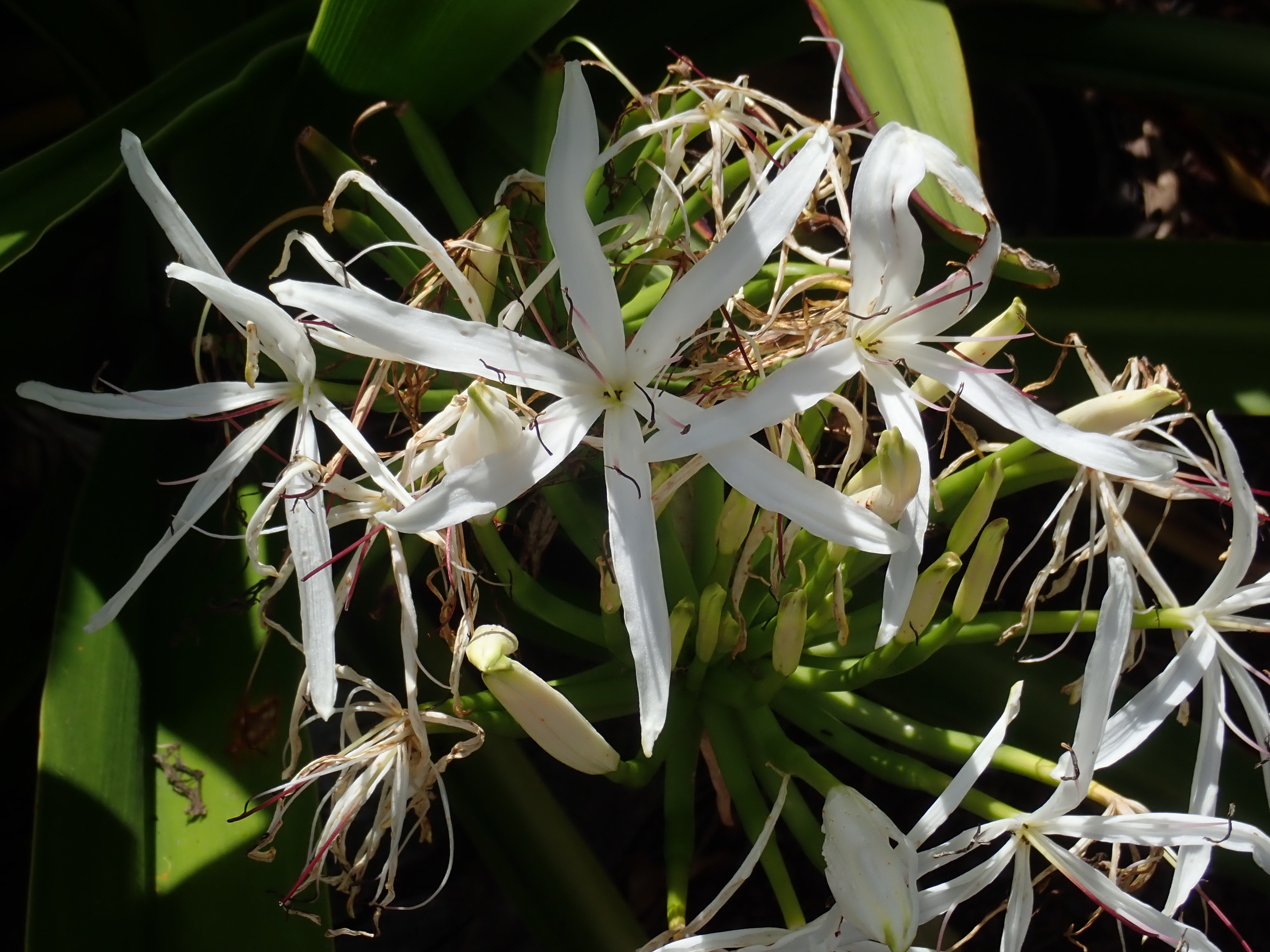

Scientific classification
- Kingdom: Plantae
- Clade: Tracheophytes
- Clade: Angiosperms
- Clade: Monocots
- Order: Asparagales
- Family: Amaryllidaceae
- Subfamily: Amaryllidoideae
- Genus: Crinum
- Species: C. pedunculatum

Binomial name
- Crinum pedunculatum R.Br.

Synonyms
- Crinum australe var. pedunculatum (R.Br.) Herb.; Crinum asiaticum var. pedunculatum (R.Br.) Fosberg & Sachet; Crinum norfolkianum A.Cunn. ex Heward

= Crinum pedunculatum =

Species of flowering plant

Crinum pedunculatum, commonly known as the swamp lily, river lily or mangrove lily, is a bulbous perennial found in stream and tidal areas of the Northern Territory, Queensland and New South Wales, Australia as well as New Guinea and some Pacific Islands. It is unclear whether it is native or introduced to Norfolk Island.

The taxon C. pedunculatum is only accepted by Australian authories; it is considered to be a synonym of Crinum asiaticum var. pedunculatum by Plants of the World Online, Catalogue of Life, Global Biodiversity Information Facility and World Flora Online. The differences between C. asiaticum and C. pedunculatum are subtle. The latter tends to be somewhat smaller, but has broader petals, giving it a less fragile appearance.

It is a very large bulbous perennial plant, up to 2 to 3 metres tall, with a spread of up to 3 metres. It likes either full sun or partial shade. It is usually found on the edge of forests, but also at the high tide level close to mangroves.

The white, fragrant flowers are in a cluster with 10 to 100 flowers on an umbel.

== Cultivation and uses ==
C. pedunculatum makes a beautiful feature plant in a large garden. It prefers a fairly well shaded position. It is a good container plant if kept well-watered. The sap has been used as a treatment for box jellyfish stings.

== Gallery ==
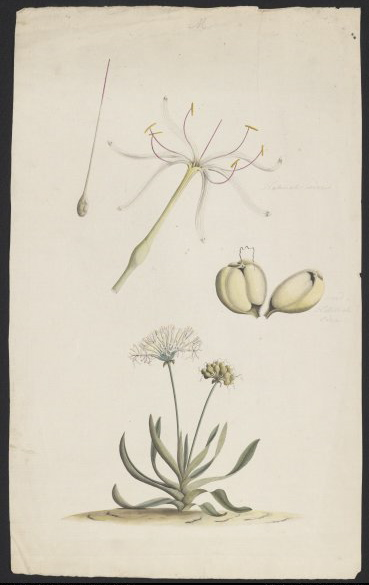
Watercolour by George Raper depicting flower, seed and entire plant

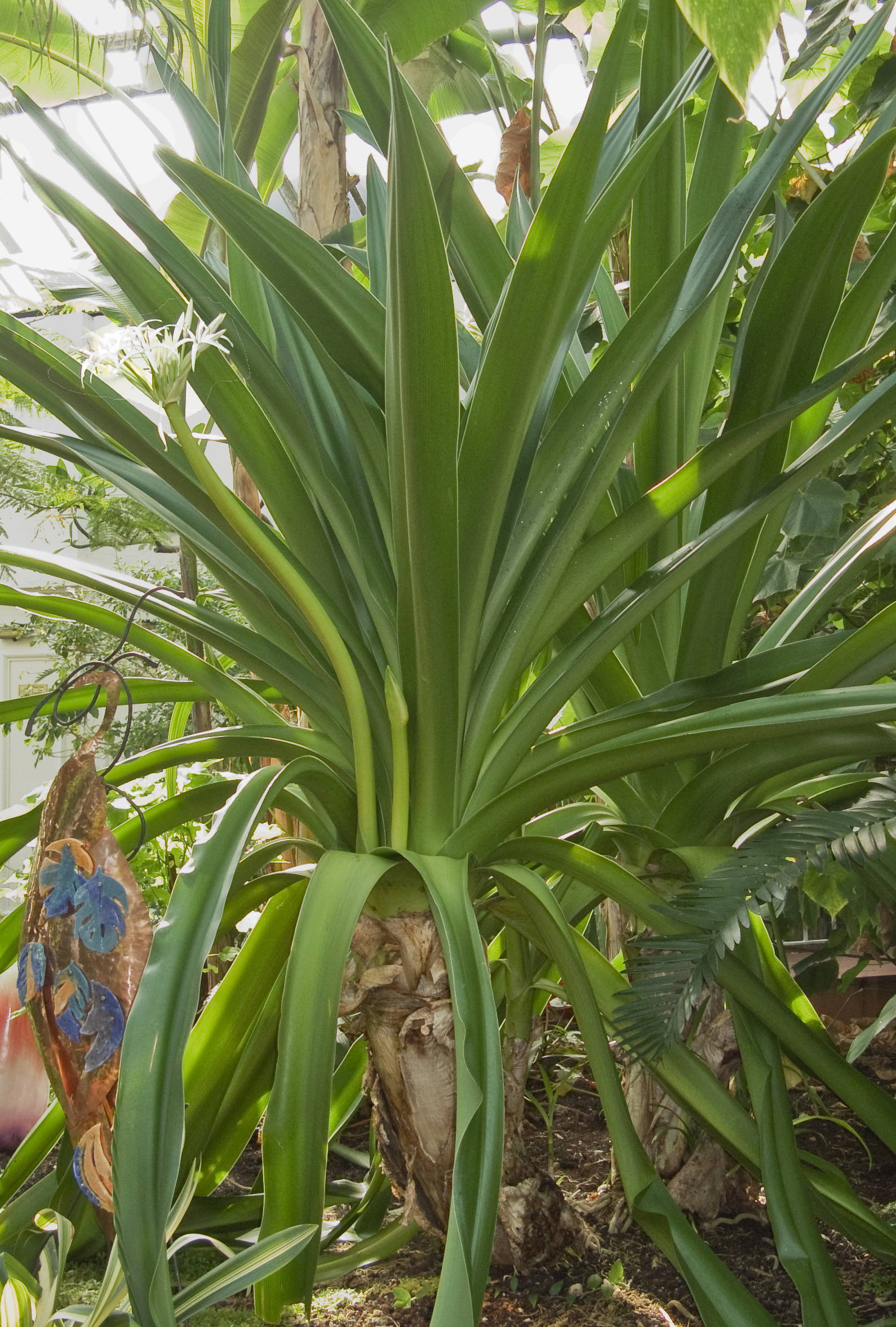
In cultivation at Birmingham Botanical Gardens (United Kingdom)

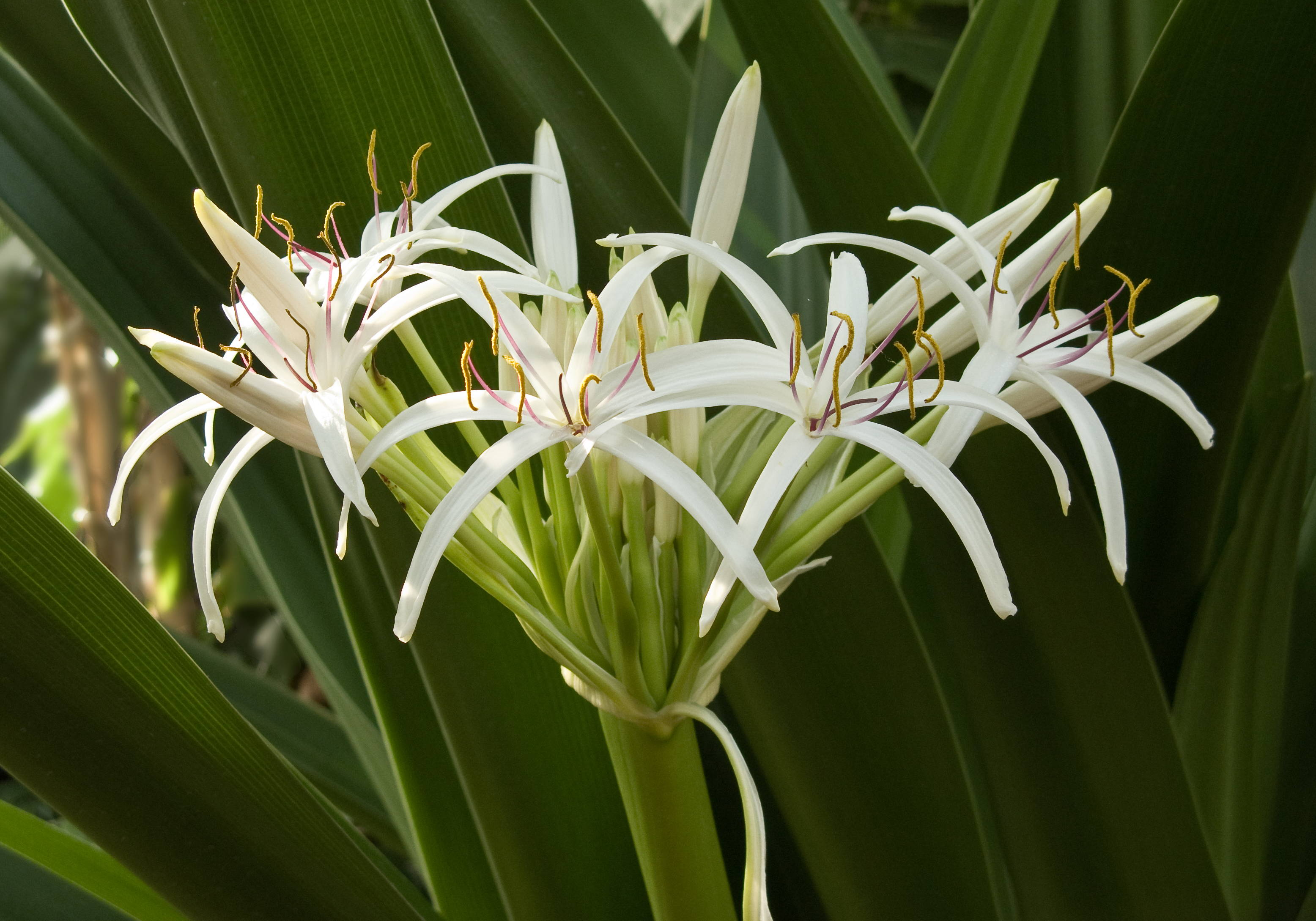
Inflorescence, in cultivation at Birmingham Botanical Gardens (United Kingdom)

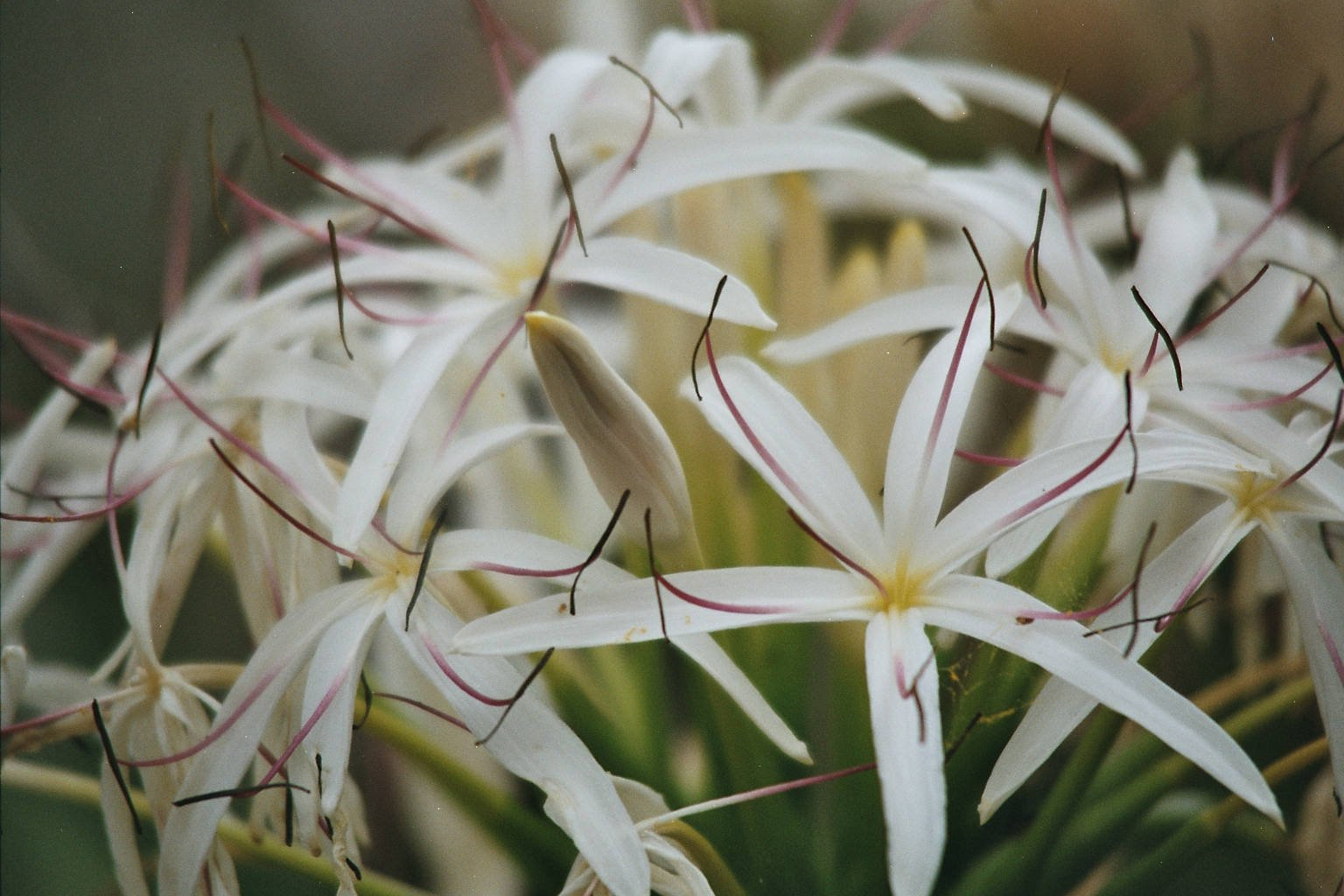
Inflorescence, Fraser Island, Australia

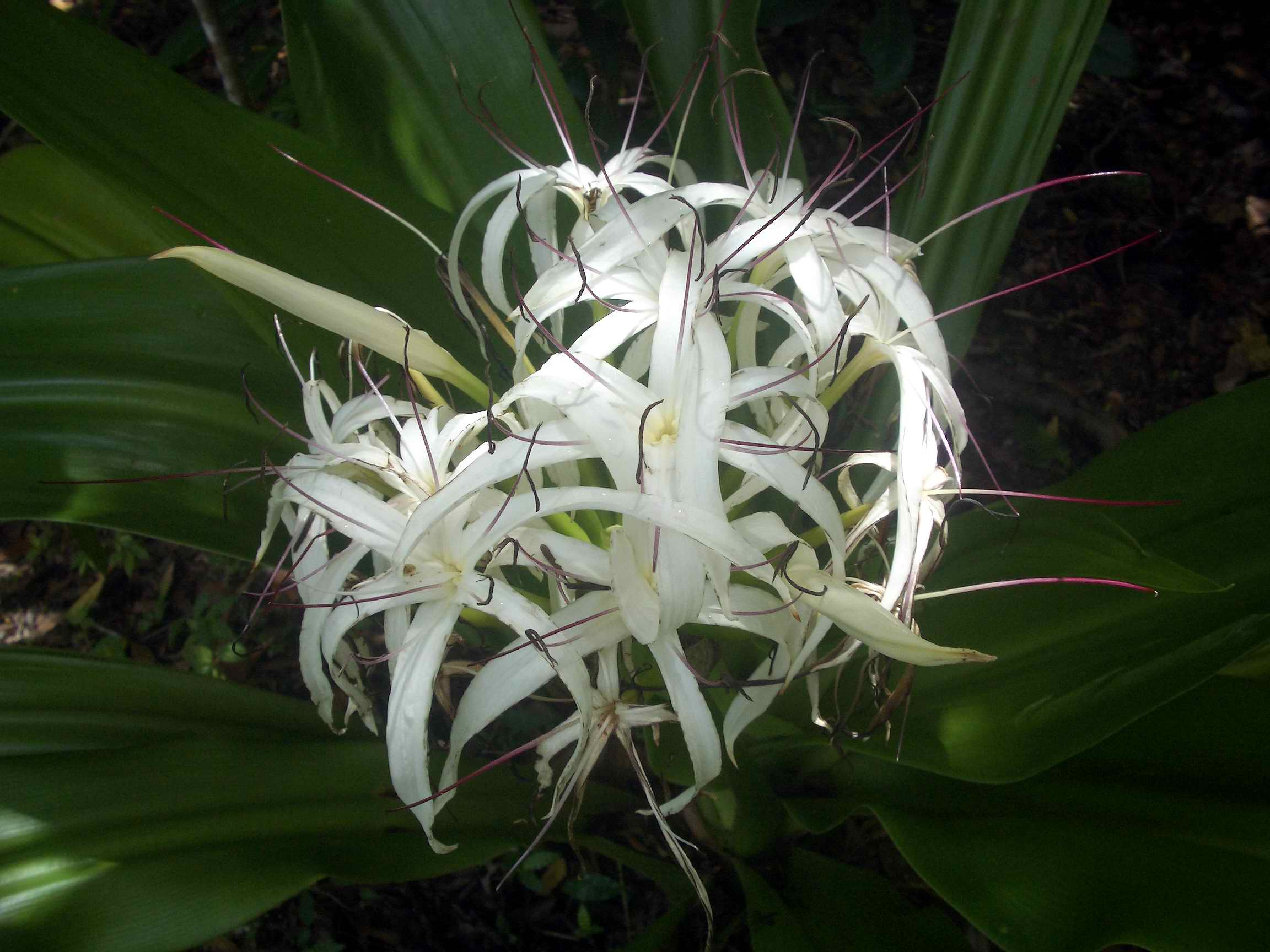
Inflorescence, Cooktown, Australia

== See also ==
- List of plants known as lily
