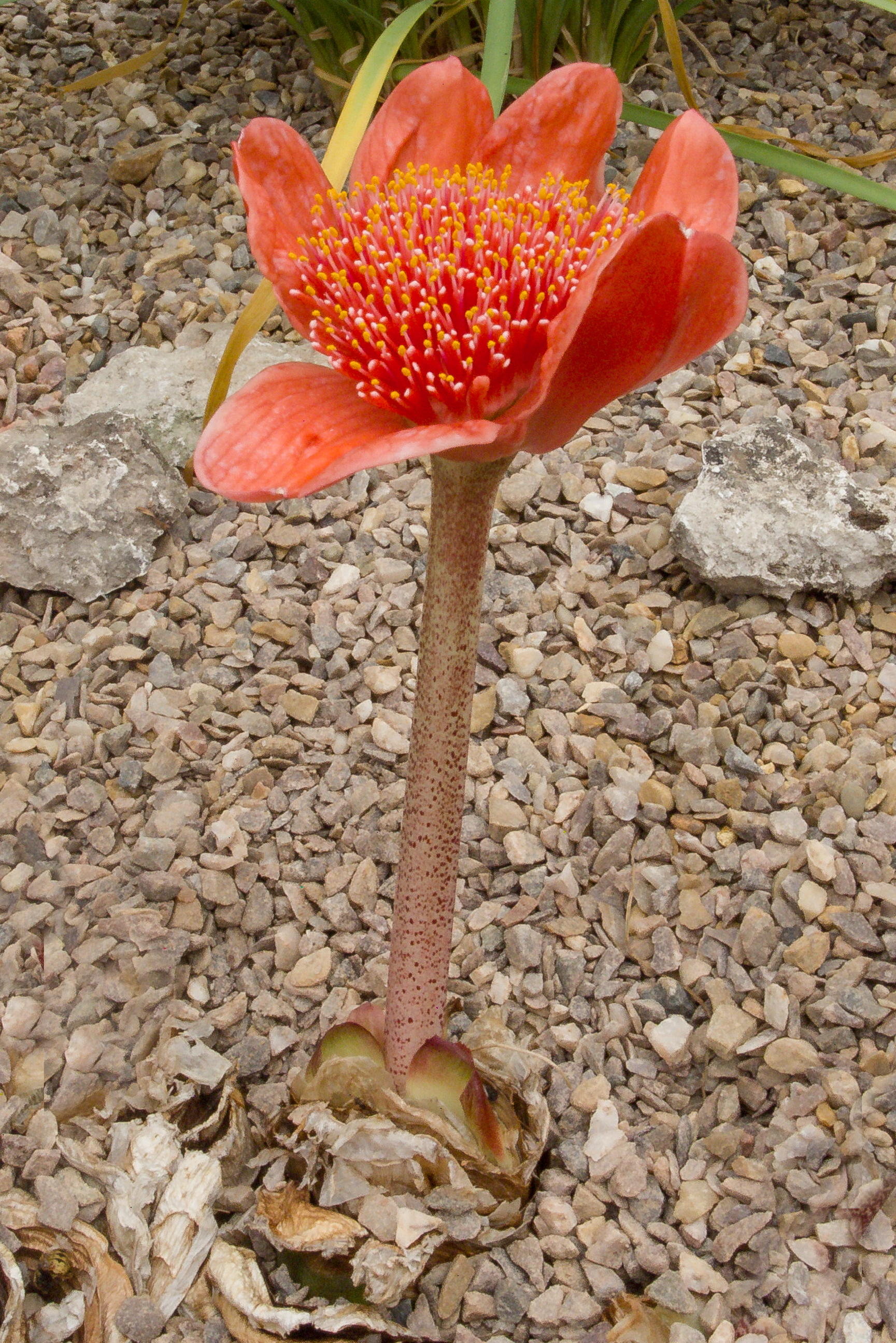
- Growing in the Cambridge University Botanic Garden

Scientific classification
- Kingdom: Plantae
- Clade: Tracheophytes
- Clade: Angiosperms
- Clade: Monocots
- Order: Asparagales
- Family: Amaryllidaceae
- Subfamily: Amaryllidoideae
- Genus: Haemanthus
- Species: H. coccineus

Binomial name
- Haemanthus coccineus L.
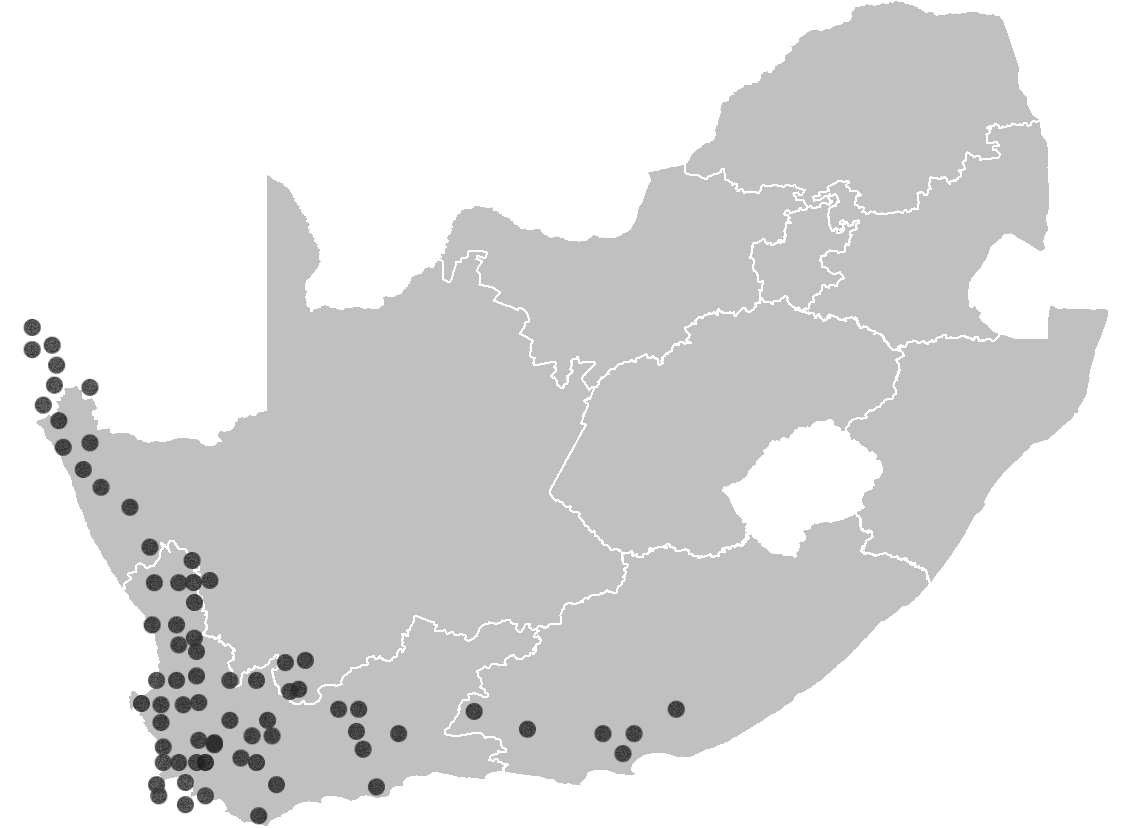
- Distribution over South Africa

Synonyms
- Haemanthus callosus Burch. ex Baker; Haemanthus carinatus L.; Haemanthus coarctatus Jacq.; Haemanthus concolor Herb.; Haemanthus crassipes Jacq.; Haemanthus hookerianus Herb.; Haemanthus hyalocarpus Jacq.; Haemanthus latifolius Salisb.; Haemanthus moschatus Jacq.; Haemanthus splendens Dinter; Haemanthus tigrinus Jacq.; Perihemia coarctata (Jacq.) Raf.

= Haemanthus coccineus =

Species of flowering plant

Haemanthus coccineus, the blood flower, blood lily or paintbrush lily, is a species of flowering plant in the amaryllis family Amaryllidaceae, native to Southern Africa. Growing to 35 cm (14 in) tall and wide, it is a bulbous perennial with short brown stems surmounted by red flowers, the flowers appearing in spring and summer, before the strap-shaped leaves.

The generic name Haemanthus is derived from the Greek words haima for blood and anthos for flower; coccineus is the Latin word for red or scarlet. In the Afrikaans language it is known as bergajuin, bloedblom, and many other vernacular names.

== Distribution ==
Haemanthus coccineus is widespread throughout the winter rainfall region in Southern Africa - from the southern parts of Namibia, to South Africa in the Cape Peninsula, to the Keiskamma River in the Eastern Cape. It is found in Renosterveld and Fynbos habitats.

It is an adaptable species, growing in a wide range of soils derived from sandstones, quartzites, granites, shales and limestones. It will survive annual rainfall ranging from 100–1,100 millimetres (3.9–43.3 in). The plant adapts to a wide range of altitudes, being found from coastal dunes to 1,200 metres (3,900 ft) high mountains. It is hardy down to about 1 °C (34 °F) but does not survive freezing temperatures for any length of time.

It is often found in clumps of hundreds, under the shelter of other shrubs on flat land, or in shady ravines and rock crevices.

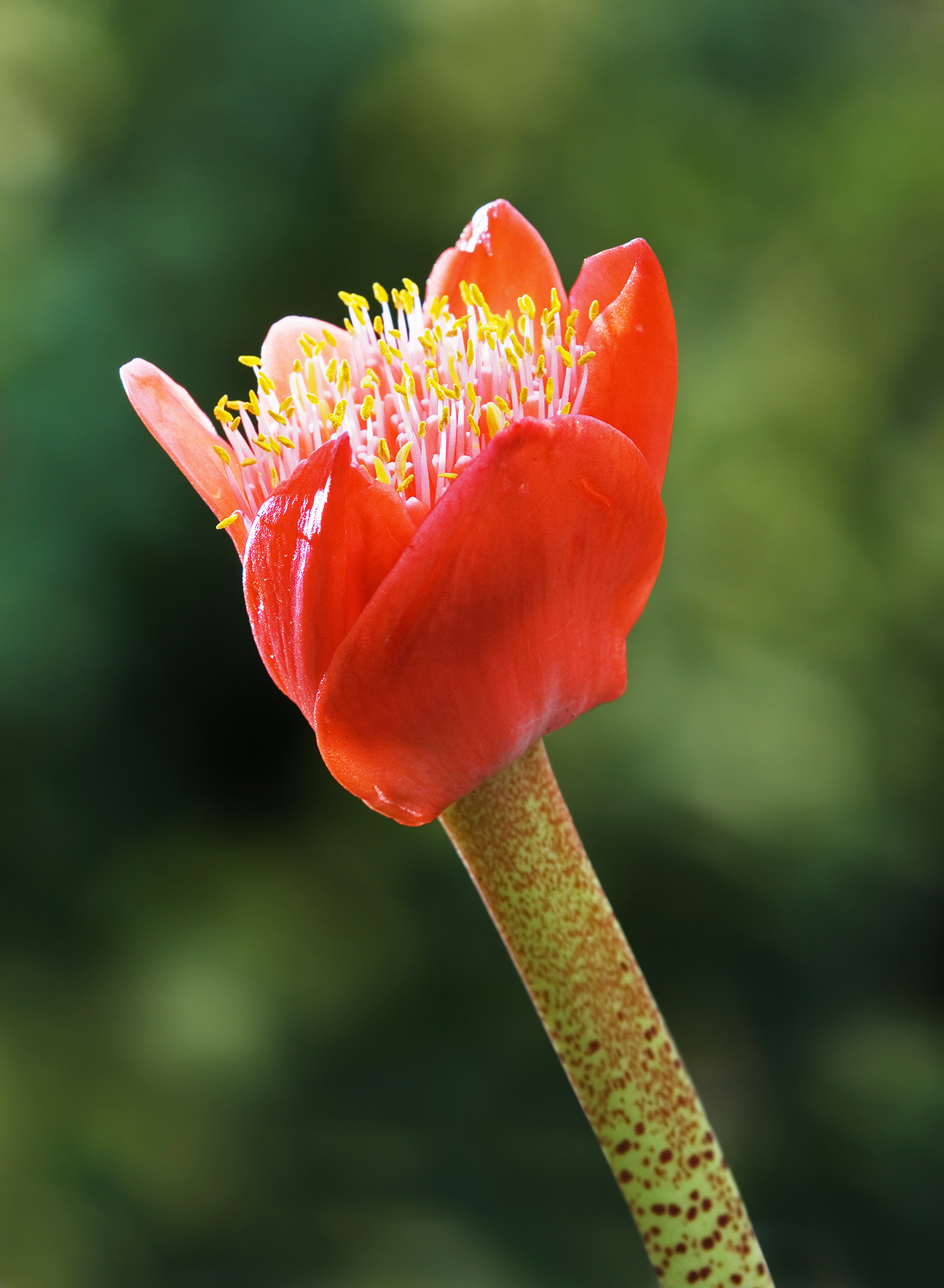
Flower emerging.

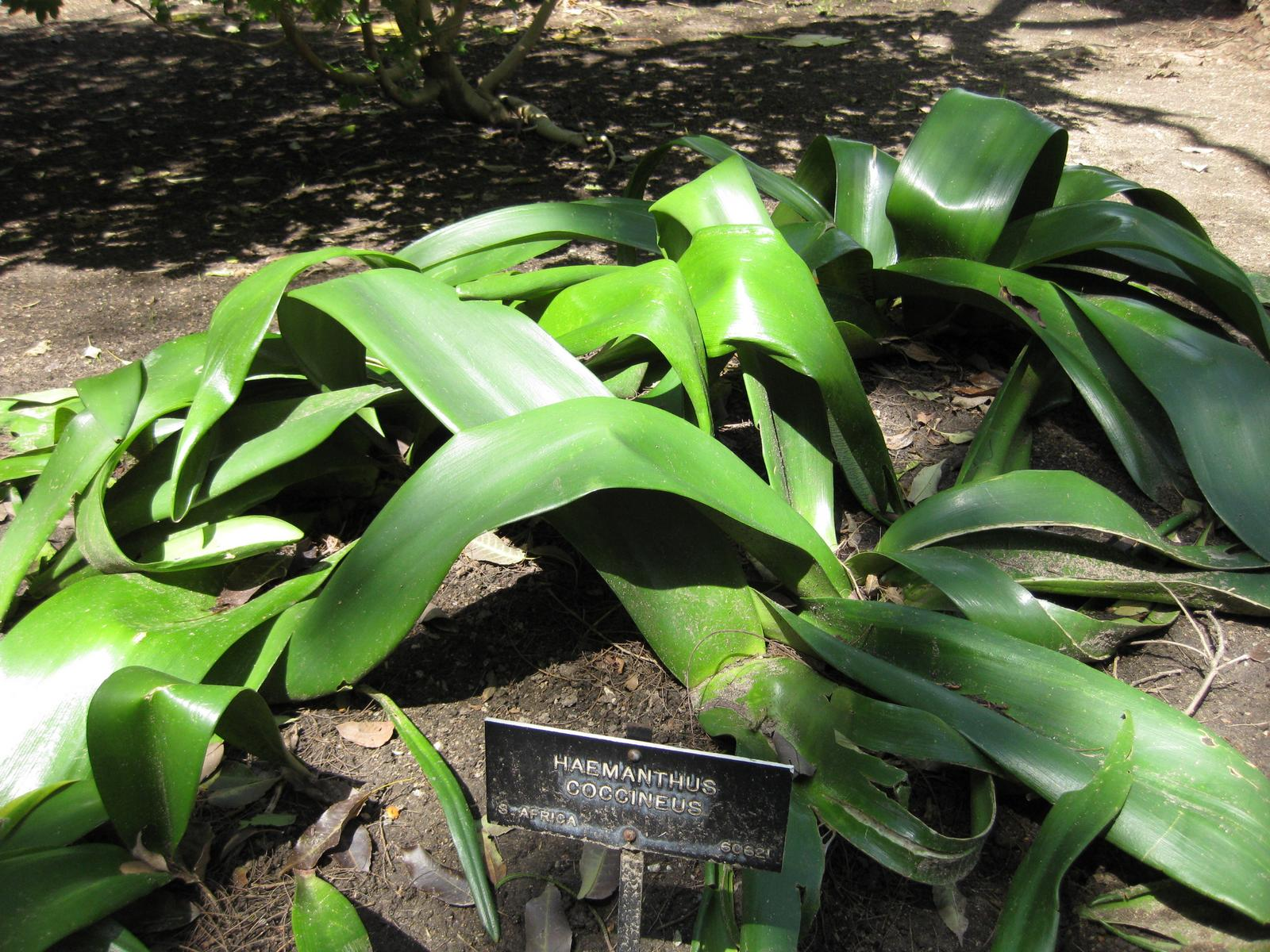
Foliage.

== Description ==
The flowerheads of Haemanthus coccineus emerge between February and April, with 6-9 stiff red spathe valves surrounding 25-100 flowers. The flowers are soon followed by translucent, fleshy berries, white to red in color. There are usually two large leaves per bulb, and occasionally three, which appear after flowering. The leaves are elliptic to broadly shaped, 25–210 mm wide, most often more-or-less barred with red or dark green on the underside; they may also be prostrate, recurved or stand suberect.

The brilliant flowerheads account for its early appearance in Europe, being described by Carl Linnaeus in 1762. Together with Haemanthus sanguineus (Jacq.), this was the first Haemanthus to be introduced to European horticulture as an ornamental plant. In cultivation in the UK, H. coccineus has gained the Royal Horticultural Society's Award of Garden Merit. It can be grown outdoors in a warm, frost-free, sheltered, south-facing location.

Despite Linnaeus' description, this same species was described under a host of different names (see gallery captions), which reflects more on taxonomic disorganisation than species variability. The plant figured on the left, was first described as Haemanthus hyalocarpus by Jacquin in 1804, and those in the gallery below, which are all H. coccineus, were first described under the caption names.

== See also ==
- Cape Floristic Region
- List of plants known as lily

== Gallery ==
- Haemanthus coccineus in botanical illustrations, with former synonyms:
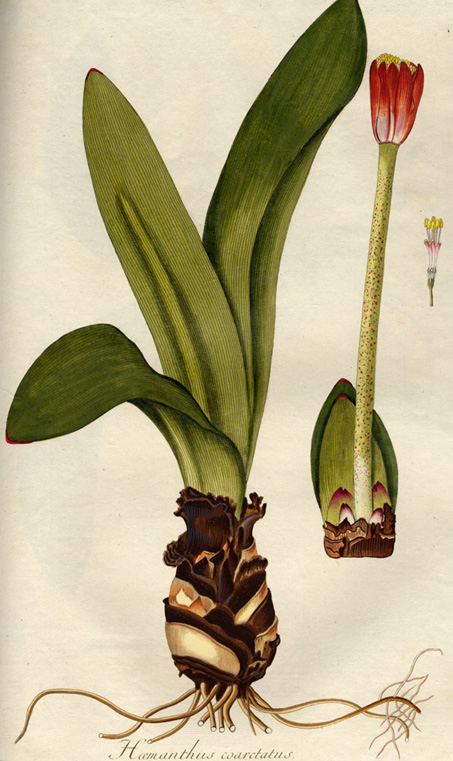
Haemanthus coarctatus

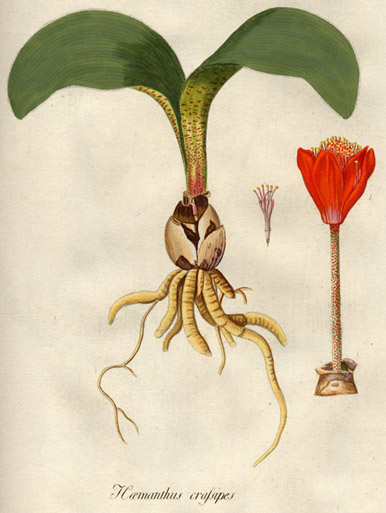
Haemanthus crassipes

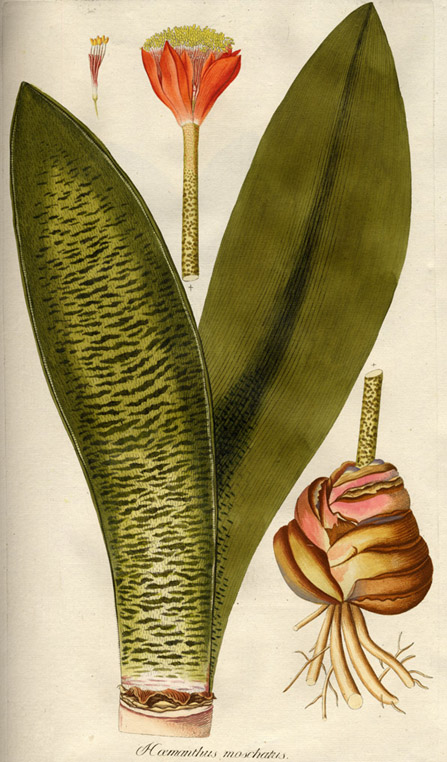
Haemanthus moschatus

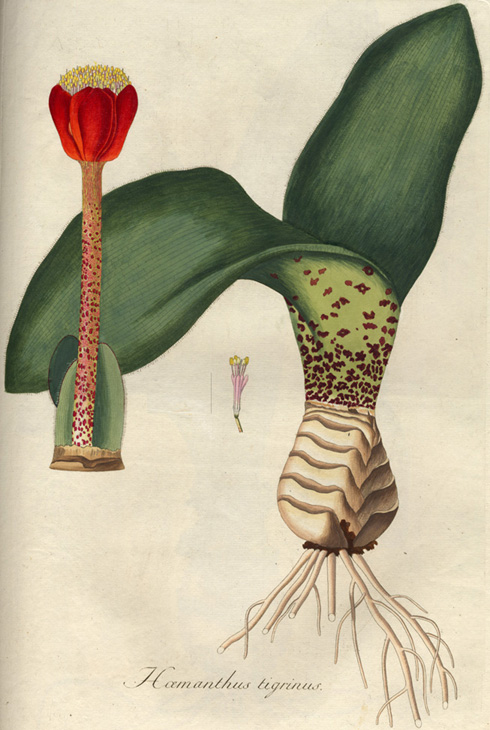
Haemanthus tigrinus

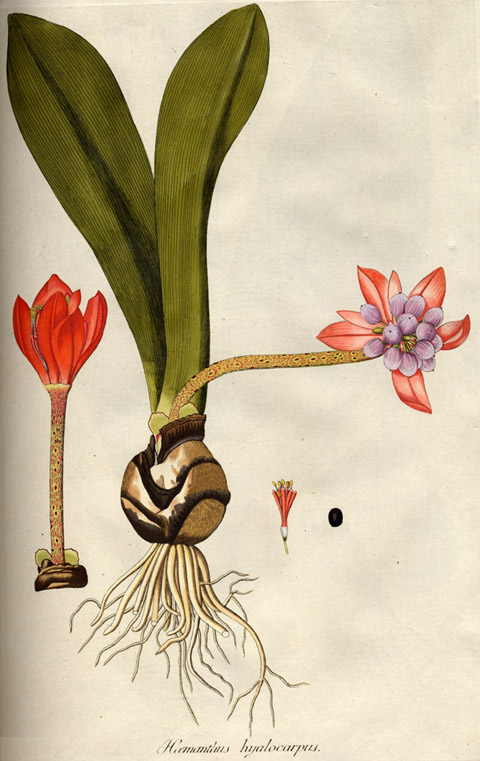
Botanical illustration by Nikolaus Joseph von Jacquin

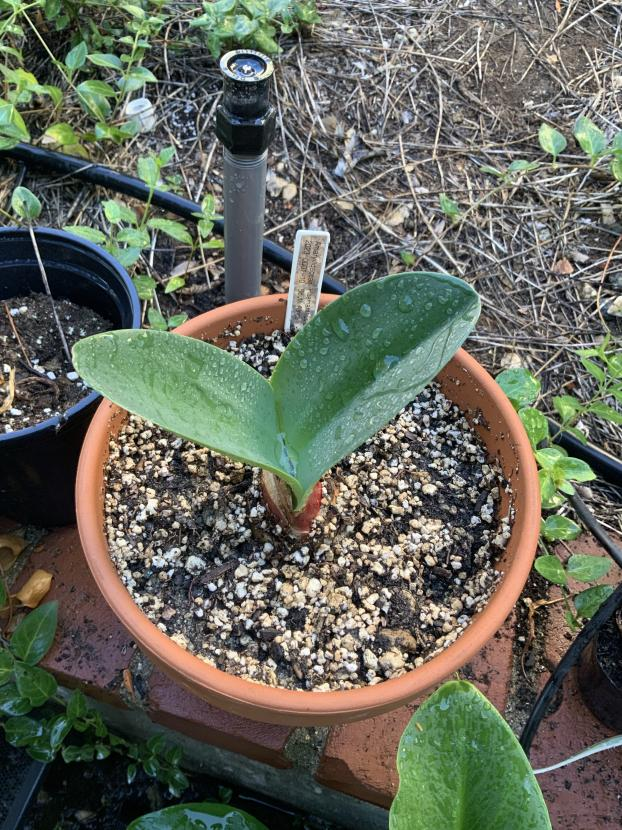
Plants
