= List of Asparagus species =

As of September 2014, the World Checklist of Selected Plant Families accepts 212 species of Asparagus:

- Asparagus acicularis F.T.Wang & S.C.Chen – S.E. China (to Hubei)
- Asparagus acocksii Jessop – S. Africa
- Asparagus acutifolius L. – Mediterranean
- Asparagus adscendens Roxb. – Pakistan to W. Himalaya
- Asparagus aethiopicus L. – Cape Province to North-West Province
- Asparagus africanus Lam. – Tropical & S. Africa, Arabian Peninsula, W. India
- Asparagus aggregatus (Oberm.) Fellingham & N.L.Mey. – Limpopo
- Asparagus albus L. – W. & Central Mediterranean
- Asparagus alopecurus (Oberm.) Malcomber & Sebsebe – W. Cape Province
- Asparagus altiscandens Engl. & Gilg – S. Tropical Africa
- Asparagus altissimus Munby – N.W. Sahara
- Asparagus angulofractus Iljin – Central Asia to S.W. Xinjiang
- Asparagus angusticladus (Jessop) J.-P.Lebrun & Stork – Tropical & S. Africa
- Asparagus aphyllus L. – Mediterranean to N.W. Arabian Peninsula
- Asparagus arborescens Willd. ex Schult. & Schult.f. – Canary Islands
- Asparagus aridicola Sebsebe – Ethiopia to Kenya
- Asparagus asiaticus L. – India
- Asparagus asparagoides (L.) Druce – S. Ethiopia to S. Africa
- Asparagus aspergillus Jessop – S. Ethiopia to S. Africa
- Asparagus baumii Engl. & Gilg – S. Tropical Africa
- Asparagus bayeri (Oberm.) Fellingham & N.L.Mey. – W. Cape Province
- Asparagus benguellensis Baker – Angola
- Asparagus bequaertii De Wild. – Zaïre
- Asparagus biflorus (Oberm.) Fellingham & N.L.Mey. – KwaZulu-Natal to Swaziland
- Asparagus botschantzevii – Central Asia
- Asparagus botswanicus Sebsebe – N. Botswana
- Asparagus brachiatus Thulin – Somalia
- Asparagus brachyphyllus Turcz. – Central Asia to Korea
- Asparagus breslerianus Schult. & Schult.f. – Caucasus to Mongolia and W. Pakistan
- Asparagus buchananii Baker – S.W. Ethiopia to S. Africa
- Asparagus bucharicus Iljin – Central Asia
- Asparagus burchellii Baker – Cape Province
- Asparagus burjaticus Peschkova – S. Siberia to N. Mongolia
- Asparagus calcicola H.Perrier – S.W. Madagascar
- Asparagus capensis L. – Namibia to Cape Province
- Asparagus capitatus Baker – N. Oman, E. Afghanistan to W. Himalaya
- Asparagus chimanimanensis Sebsebe – S. Tropical Africa (Chimanimani Mts)
- Asparagus clareae (Oberm.) Fellingham & N.L.Mey. – Northern Province
- Asparagus cochinchinensis (Lour.) Merr. – Japan to Indo-China and Philippines (N. Luzon)
- Asparagus coddii (Oberm.) Fellingham & N.L.Mey. – KwaZulu-Natal
- Asparagus concinnus (Baker) Kies – S. Africa
- Asparagus confertus K.Krause – W. Cape Province
- Asparagus coodei P.H.Davis – Turkey (Içel, Konya)
- Asparagus crassicladus Jessop – Cape Province
- Asparagus curillus Buch.-Ham. ex Roxb. – W. Central & Central Himalaya to India (Punjab)
- Asparagus dauricus Fisch. ex Link – Siberia to N.E. Korea
- Asparagus declinatus L. – Namibia to W. Cape Province, Madagascar
- Asparagus deflexus Baker – Angola
- Asparagus densiflorus (Kunth) Jessop – Mozambique (Inhaca Islands) to S. Africa
- Asparagus denudatus (Kunth) Baker – E. Tropical & S. Africa
- Asparagus devenishii (Oberm.) Fellingham & N.L.Mey. – S. Africa
- Asparagus divaricatus (Oberm.) Fellingham & N.L.Mey. – E .Zimbabwe to S. Africa
- Asparagus drepanophyllus Welw. ex Baker – W. Central Tropical Africa to Angola
- Asparagus duchesnei L.Linden – Zaïre
- Asparagus dumosus Baker – Pakistan to N.W. India
- Asparagus edulis (Oberm.) J.-P.Lebrun & Stork – Zimbabwe to S. Africa
- Asparagus elephantinus S.M.Burrows – Limpopo
- Asparagus equisetoides Welw. ex Baker – Angola
- Asparagus exsertus (Oberm.) Fellingham & N.L.Mey. – S.W. Cape Province
- Asparagus exuvialis Burch. – S. Tropical & S. Africa
- Asparagus falcatus L. – S.W. Ethiopia to S. Africa, Arabian Peninsula, India, Sri Lanka
- Asparagus fallax Svent. – Canary Islands
- Asparagus fasciculatus Thunb. – Namibia to Free State, Madagascar
- Asparagus faulkneri Sebsebe – S.E. Kenya to Tanzania
- Asparagus ferganensis Vved. – Central Asia
- Asparagus filicinus Buch.-Ham. ex D.Don – Himalaya to Central China
- Asparagus filicladus (Oberm.) Fellingham & N.L.Mey. – Cape Province
- Asparagus filifolius Bertol. – Syria to Iraq
- Asparagus flagellaris (Kunth) Baker – Tropical & S. Africa, W. Arabian Peninsula
- Asparagus flavicaulis (Oberm.) Fellingham & N.L.Mey. – Zimbabwe to Northern Province
- Asparagus fouriei (Oberm.) Fellingham & N.L.Mey. – Limpopo
- Asparagus fractiflexus (Oberm.) Fellingham & N.L.Mey. – Northern Province to KwaZulu-Natal
- Asparagus fysonii J.F.Macbr. – S. India
- Asparagus gharoensis Blatt. – S. Pakistan
- Asparagus glaucus Kies – S. Africa
- Asparagus gobicus N.A.Ivanova ex Grubov – Mongolia to N. China
- Asparagus gonoclados Baker – S. India, Sri Lanka
- Asparagus graniticus (Oberm.) Fellingham & N.L.Mey. – Namibia to W. Cape Province
- Asparagus greveanus H.Perrier – W. & S.W. Madagascar
- Asparagus griffithii Baker – Iran to W. Himalaya
- Asparagus gypsaceus Vved. – Central Asia (Pamir Mts.)
- Asparagus hajrae Kamble – Assam
- Asparagus hirsutus S.M.Burrows – Limpopo
- Asparagus homblei De Wild. – Zaïre
- Asparagus horridus L. – Canary Islands, Mediterranean to Arabian Peninsula
- Asparagus humilis Engl. – S.E. Kenya to Mozambique
- Asparagus inderiensis Blume ex Ledeb. – Crimea to Central Asia
- Asparagus intricatus (Oberm.) Fellingham & N.L.Mey. – S. Africa
- Asparagus juniperoides Engl. – S.W. Namibia to N.W. Cape Province
- Asparagus kaessneri De Wild. – Zaïre
- Asparagus kansuensis F.T.Wang & Tang ex S.C.Chen – China (S. Gansu)
- Asparagus karthikeyanii (Kamble) M.R.Almeida – India (Maharashtra)
- Asparagus katangensis De Wild. & T.Durand – S. Zaïre
- Asparagus khorasanensis Hamdi & Assadi – Iran
- Asparagus kiusianus Makino – Japan (Kyushu)
- Asparagus kraussianus (Kunth) J.F.Macbr. – S.W. Cape Province
- Asparagus krebsianus (Kunth) Jessop – Central & S. Malawi to Cape Province
- Asparagus laevissimus Steud. ex Baker – S. India
- Asparagus laricinus Burch. – Congo to Tanzania and S. Africa
- Asparagus lecardii De Wild. – Zaïre
- Asparagus ledebourii Miscz. – E. Caucasus
- Asparagus leptocladodius Chiov. – S. Ethiopia to Djibouti and Kenya
- Asparagus lignosus Burm.f. – S.W. Cape Province
- Asparagus litoralis Steven - England, Ukraine, Russia, Bulgaria, and Turkey
- Asparagus longicladus N.E.Br. – Zimbabwe to Botswana
- Asparagus longiflorus Franch. – Qinghai to N. Central China
- Asparagus longipes Baker – Cameroon
- Asparagus lycaonicus P.H.Davis – Turkey (Konya), Iran (Arak salt lake)
- Asparagus lycicus P.H.Davis – Turkey (Antalya)
- Asparagus lycopodineus (Baker) F.T.Wang & Tang – Bhutan to Central China
- Asparagus lynetteae (Oberm.) Fellingham & N.L.Mey. – Mpumalanga
- Asparagus macowanii Baker – Mozambique to S. Africa
- Asparagus madecassus H.Perrier – Madagascar
- Asparagus mahafalensis H.Perrier – S.W. Madagascar
- Asparagus mairei H.Lév. – China (Yunnan)
- Asparagus mariae (Oberm.) Fellingham & N.L.Mey. – Cape Province
- Asparagus maritimus (L.) Mill. – S. Europe to Crimea
- Asparagus meioclados H.Lév. – S. Central China
- Asparagus merkeri K.Krause – Tanzania
- Asparagus microraphis (Kunth) Baker – S. Africa
- Asparagus migeodii Sebsebe – S. Tanzania to S. Tropical Africa
- Asparagus minutiflorus (Kunth) Baker – Mozambique to S. Africa
- Asparagus mollis (Oberm.) Fellingham & N.L.Mey. – W. Cape Province
- Asparagus monophyllus Baker – Afghanistan to W. Pakistan
- Asparagus mozambicus Kunth – Mozambique (I. Quirimba)
- Asparagus mucronatus Jessop – Cape Province
- Asparagus multituberosus R.A.Dyer – W. Cape Province
- Asparagus munitus F.T.Wang & S.C.Chen – S. Central China
- Asparagus myriacanthus F.T.Wang & S.C.Chen – S.E. Tibet to China (N.W. Yunnan)
- Asparagus natalensis (Baker) J.-P.Lebrun & Stork – Ethiopia to S. Africa
- Asparagus neglectus Kar. & Kir. – Siberia to W. Himalaya
- Asparagus nelsii Schinz – Zambia to S. Africa
- Asparagus nesiotes Svent. – Selvagens, Canary Islands
- Asparagus nodulosus (Oberm.) J.-P.Lebrun & Stork – Zimbabwe to S. Africa
- Asparagus officinalis L. – Europe to Mongolia, N.W. Africa
- Asparagus oligoclonos Maxim. – Mongolia to Japan
- Asparagus oliveri (Oberm.) Fellingham & N.L.Mey. – S. Tropical Africa to Botswana
- Asparagus ovatus T.M.Salter – S.W. & S. Cape Province
- Asparagus oxyacanthus Baker – E. Cape Province
- Asparagus pachyrrhizus – Central Asia
- Asparagus palaestinus Baker – Israel (Jordan Valley), Turkey
- Asparagus pallasii Miscz. – E. Romania to Siberia
- Asparagus pastorianus Webb & Berthel. – Canary Islands, W. Morocco
- Asparagus pearsonii Kies – Namibia to W. Cape Province
- Asparagus pendulus (Oberm.) J.-P.Lebrun & Stork – S. Tropical Africa to Botswana
- Asparagus penicillatus H.Hara – W. Nepal
- Asparagus persicus Baker – Central Turkey to Mongolia and W. Pakistan
- Asparagus petersianus Kunth – Tanzania to Mozambique
- Asparagus plocamoides Webb ex Svent. – Canary Islands
- Asparagus poissonii H.Perrier – S.W. Madagascar
- Asparagus prostratus Dumort. – Coasts of W. Europe
- Asparagus przewalskyi N.A.Ivanova ex Grubov & T.V.Egorova – Qinghai
- Asparagus pseudoscaber Grecescu – S.E. Europe to Ukraine
- Asparagus psilurus Welw. ex Baker – S. Tropical & S. Africa
- Asparagus punjabensis J.L.Stewart – India
- Asparagus pygmaeus Makino – Japan
- Asparagus racemosus Willd. – Tropical Africa to N. Australia
- Asparagus radiatus Sebsebe – S. Mozambique to Swaziland (Umbeluzi Gorge)
- Asparagus ramosissimus Baker – S. Africa
- Asparagus recurvispinus (Oberm.) Fellingham & N.L.Mey. – Cape Province
- Asparagus retrofractus L. – Namibia to Cape Province
- Asparagus richardsiae Sebsebe – Zambia
- Asparagus rigidus Jessop – Northern Province
- Asparagus ritschardii De Wild. – Zaïre
- Asparagus rogersii R.E.Fr. – Kenya to Zambia
- Asparagus rottleri Baker – S. India
- Asparagus rubicundus P.J.Bergius – Cape Province
- Asparagus rubricaulis (Kunth) Baker – India
- Asparagus sapinii De Wild. – Zaïre
- Asparagus sarmentosus L. – India
- Asparagus saundersiae Baker – Malawi, S. Africa
- Asparagus scaberulus A.Rich. – N.E. & E. Tropical Africa
- Asparagus scandens Thunb. – S.W. & S. Cape Province
- Asparagus schoberioides Kunth – S.E. Siberia to Japan
- Asparagus schroederi Engl. – Tropical & S. Africa
- Asparagus schumanianus Schltr. ex H.Perrier – S.W. Madagascar
- Asparagus scoparius Lowe – Macaronesia
- Asparagus sekukuniensis (Oberm.) Fellingham & N.L.Mey. – Northern Province
- Asparagus setaceus (Kunth) Jessop – Central Ethiopia to S. Africa, Comoros
- Asparagus sichuanicus S.C.Chen & D.Q.Liu – Tibet to China (Sichuan)
- Asparagus simulans Baker – Madagascar
- Asparagus spinescens Steud. ex Schult. & Schult.f. – E. Cape Province
- Asparagus squarrosus J.A.Schmidt – Cape Verde
- Asparagus stachyphyllus H.Lév. & Vaniot – Korea
- Asparagus stellatus Baker – E. Cape Province to Lesotho
- Asparagus stipulaceus Lam. – S.W. Cape Province
- Asparagus striatus (L.f.) Thunb. – Cape Province to Free State
- Asparagus suaveolens Burch. – Kenya to S. Africa
- Asparagus subfalcatus De Wild. – Zaïre
- Asparagus subscandens F.T.Wang & S.C.Chen – China (S. Yunnan)
- Asparagus subulatus Thunb. – E. Cape Province
- Asparagus sylvicola S.M.Burrows – Northern Province to Swaziland
- Asparagus taliensis F.T.Wang & Tang ex S.C.Chen – China (Yunnan)
- Asparagus tamariscinus N.A.Ivanova ex Grubov – Central Asia to S. Siberia and Mongolia
- Asparagus tenuifolius Lam. – Mediterranean to Ukraine
- Asparagus tibeticus F.T.Wang & S.C.Chen – Tibet
- Asparagus transvaalensis (Oberm.) Fellingham & N.L.Mey. – Northern Province to Swaziland
- Asparagus trichoclados (F.T.Wang & Tang) F.T.Wang & S.C.Chen – China (Central Yunnan)
- Asparagus trichophyllus Bunge – W. Asia, Mongolia to N. China
- Asparagus turkestanicus Popov – Central Asia
- Asparagus uhligii K.Krause – Tanzania
- Asparagus umbellatus Link – Macaronesia
- Asparagus umbellulatus Bresler – Seychelles to Mascarenes
- Asparagus undulatus (L.f.) Thunb. – Namibia to W. Cape Province
- Asparagus usambarensis Sebsebe – Tanzania (Usambara Mts.)
- Asparagus vaginellatus Bojer ex Baker – Madagascar
- Asparagus verticillatus L. – S.E. Europe to Iran
- Asparagus virgatus Baker – Yemen, S. Tanzania to S. Africa
- Asparagus volubilis (L.f.) Thunb. – Cape Province
- Asparagus vvedenskyi Botsch. – Central Asia
- Asparagus warneckei (Engl.) Hutch. – W. & W. Central Tropical Africa
- Asparagus yanbianensis S.C.Chen – China (S.W. Sichuan)
- Asparagus yanyuanensis S.C.Chen – China (S.W. Sichuan)
