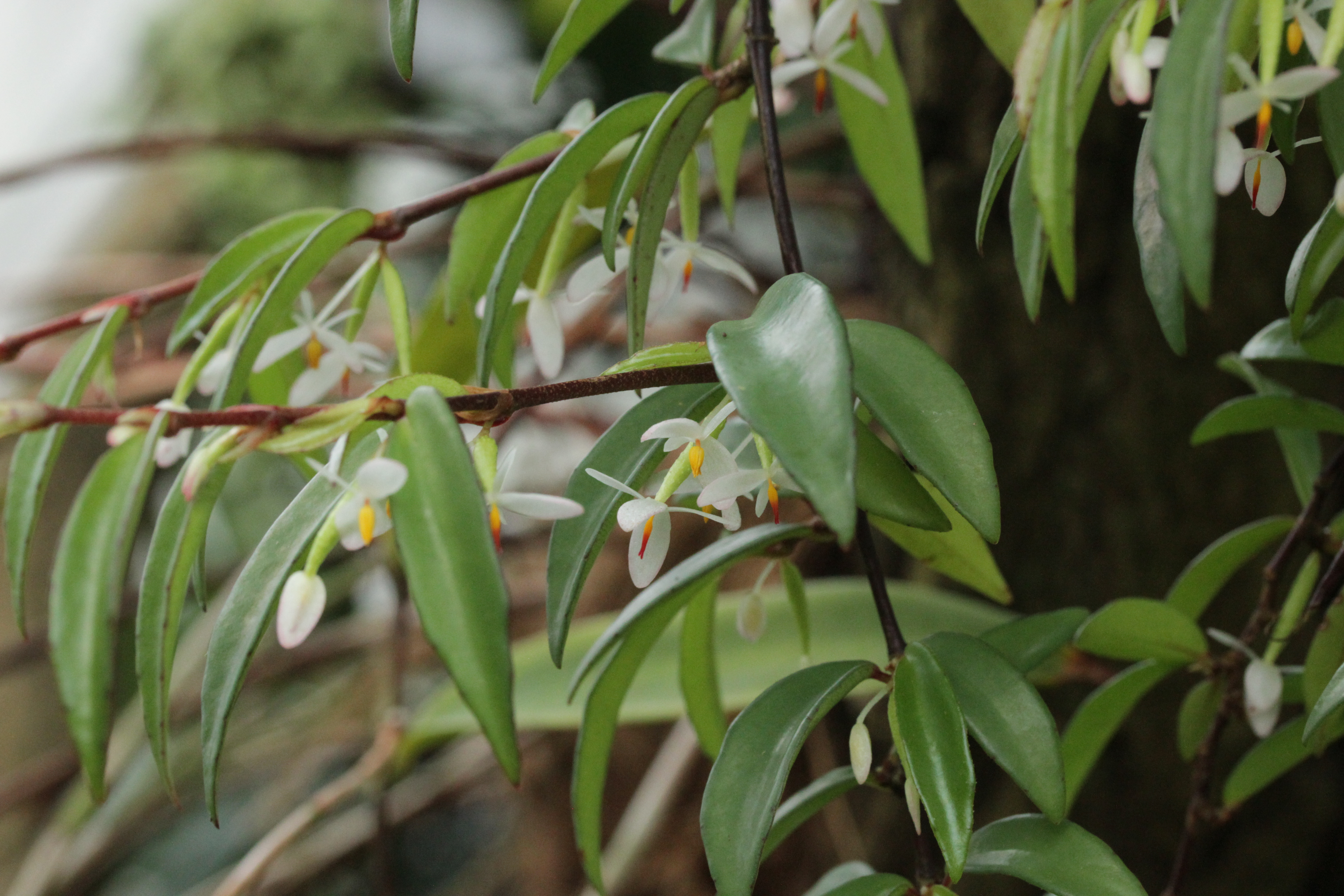

Scientific classification
- Kingdom: Plantae
- Clade: Tracheophytes
- Clade: Angiosperms
- Clade: Eudicots
- Clade: Rosids
- Order: Cucurbitales
- Family: Begoniaceae
- Genus: Begonia
- Species: B. polygonoides

Binomial name
- Begonia polygonoides Hook.f

Synonyms
- Begonia cataractarum J.Braun & K.Schum.; Begonia epilobioides Warb.; Begonia rhipsaloides A.Chev.

= Begonia polygonoides =

Species of flowering plant

Begonia polygonoides is a species of flowering plant in the family Begoniaceae, native to west central Africa. Though it grows primarily in wet tropical biomes, it is epiphytic and grows in the tree canopy where atmospheric conditions are much drier.

Begonia polygonoides can be found in Gabon, Guinea, Ivory Coast, Liberia, Nigeria, Ghana, Zaire, Cameroon and DR Congo. As a houseplant, it is grown in trailing baskets, or trained to grow up a moss pole.

The species was first documented in 1871.
