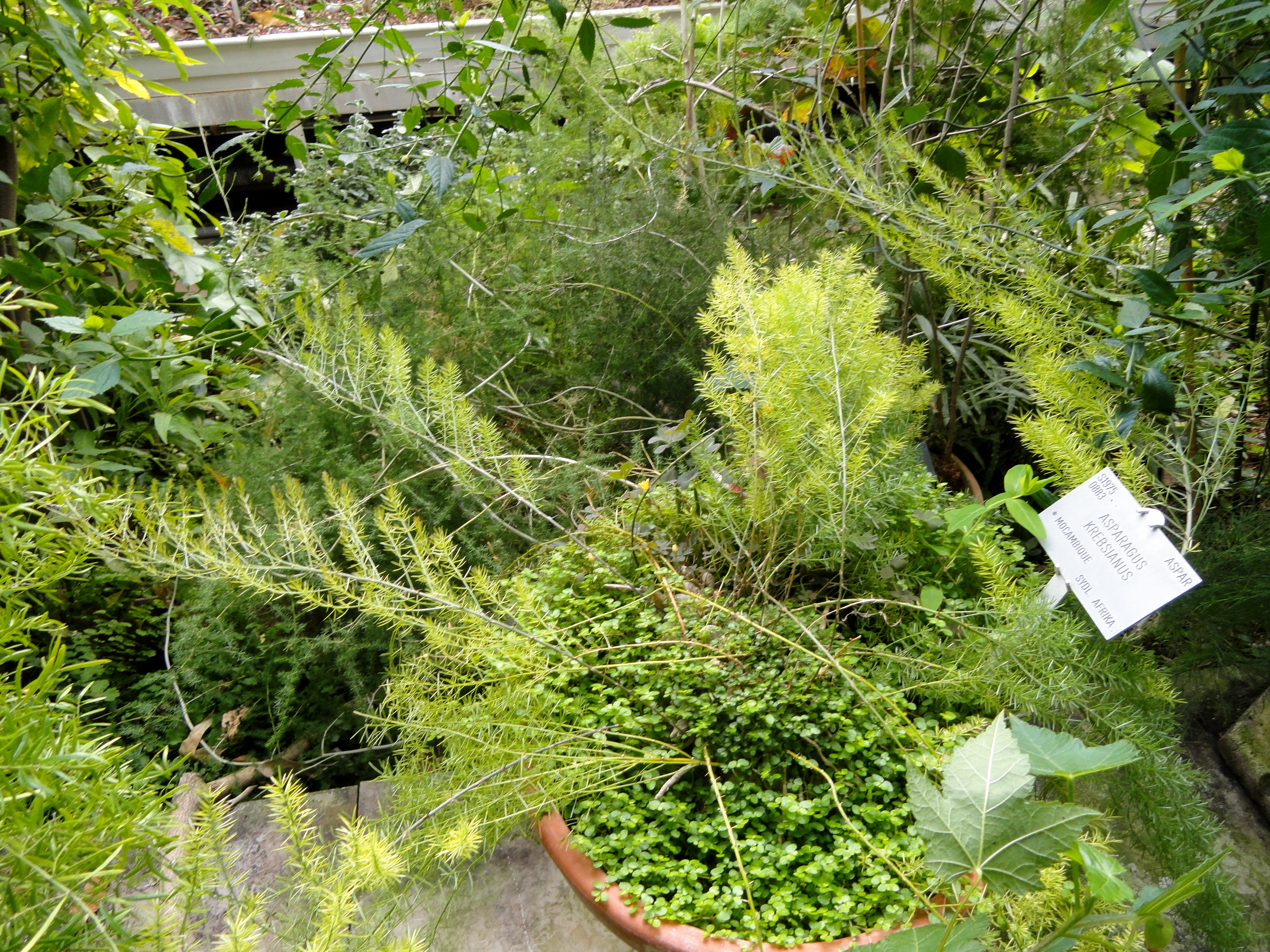

Scientific classification
- Kingdom: Plantae
- Clade: Tracheophytes
- Clade: Angiosperms
- Clade: Monocots
- Order: Asparagales
- Family: Asparagaceae
- Subfamily: Asparagoideae
- Genus: Asparagus
- Species: A. krebsianus

Binomial name
- Asparagus krebsianus (Kunth) Jessop (1966)

Synonyms
- Asparagopsis krebsiana Kunth (1850); Protasparagus krebsianus (Kunth) Oberm. (1983)

= Asparagus krebsianus =

Species of shrub

Asparagus krebsianus is a shrub of the Asparagus genus that is native to rocky areas in southern Africa. It ranges from central Malawi through Mozambique to the Northern Provinces, KwaZulu-Natal, and Cape Provinces of South Africa.

== Description ==
It has tuberous roots, and smooth, grey-green, scrambling-twining, sometimes zig-zagged stems. Stems and branches all have slightly darker spines. The leaves are small, linear or needle-like, slightly triangular in cross-section, and appear in tufts.

=== Related species ===
It is part of a group of similar and related African Asparagus species, including Asparagus aethiopicus, Asparagus confertus and Asparagus densiflorus.
