= Asparagus litoralis =

Scientific classification
- Kingdom: Plantae
- Clade: Tracheophytes
- Clade: Angiosperms
- Clade: Monocots
- Order: Asparagales
- Family: Asparagaceae
- Subfamily: Asparagoideae
- Genus: Asparagus
- Species: A. litoralis

Binomial name
- Asparagus litoralis Steven

Synonyms
- See text.

Species of plant

Asparagus litoralis, common name coastal asparagus, is an evergreen perennial plant species belonging to the genus Asparagus in the monocot family Asparagaceae, according to some sources, including the Black Sea Red Data Book. Other sources do not recognize this species, placing the four synonyms recognized by the Black Sea Red Data Book into two different species:

- Asparagus ferganensis Vved, synonym Asparagus monoclados Vved.
- Asparagus neglectus Kar et Kir, synonym Asparagus misczenkoi Iljin

== Description ==
For those sources that recognize the species, Asparagus litoralis is a perennial herbaceous plant that grows up to 30–50 centimetres (12–20 in) in height. The top of the branches is where flowers normally bloom. In May and June the flowers bloom and in July and August it starts bearing fruit. The population has been declining and is not overly abundant. It is normally pollinated by bumblebees.

== Habitat and conservation ==
When recognized as a single species, its habitat is coastal, including sandy and rocky areas. It is vulnerable in the Black Sea region.
