= Asparagus (disambiguation) =

Asparagus is a type of vegetable.

Asparagus may also refer to:

- Asparagus (genus), the name of a genus of plants
- Asparagus (color), a brownish shade of green that resembles the plant asparagus
- Asparagus (film), a 1979 American experimental animated short film
- Asparagus (Bluey), an episode of the Australian television show Bluey
- Cannabis (drug)

== See also ==
- List of Asparagus species
- Asparagus beetle
- Asparagus Island, Cornwall, England
