= Hemiphylacus latifolius =

Scientific classification
- Kingdom: Plantae
- Clade: Tracheophytes
- Clade: Angiosperms
- Clade: Monocots
- Order: Asparagales
- Family: Asparagaceae
- Subfamily: Asparagoideae
- Genus: Hemiphylacus
- Species: H. latifolius

Binomial name
- Hemiphylacus latifolius S.Watson

Species of flowering plant

Hemiphylacus latifolius is a species of flowering plant native to Mexico, specifically the Coahuila region. It belongs to the Asparagaceae family and is a tuberous geophyte. This plant primarily thrives in desert or dry shrubland biome.
