= Asparagus gharoensis =

Scientific classification
- Kingdom: Plantae
- Clade: Tracheophytes
- Clade: Angiosperms
- Clade: Monocots
- Order: Asparagales
- Family: Asparagaceae
- Subfamily: Asparagoideae
- Genus: Asparagus
- Species: A. gharoensis

Binomial name
- Asparagus gharoensis Blatt.

Species of plant

Asparagus gharoensis is a species of plant in the family Asparagaceae. It was first published in the Journal of the Indian Botanical Society in 1927.

== Description ==
Asparagus gharoensis is a perennial plant that grows primarily in the seasonally dry tropical biome.

== Distribution ==
The native range of this species is in areas of southern Pakistan.

== Conservation status ==
Asparagus gharoensis is now extinct.
