= Asparagus burchellii =

Scientific classification
- Kingdom: Plantae
- Clade: Tracheophytes
- Clade: Angiosperms
- Clade: Monocots
- Order: Asparagales
- Family: Asparagaceae
- Subfamily: Asparagoideae
- Genus: Asparagus
- Species: A. burchellii

Binomial name
- Asparagus burchellii Baker

Species of shrub

Asparagus burchellii, is a shrub of the Asparagus genus, that is indigenous to dry scrub vegetion in the southern Cape region, South Africa.

== Description ==
A perennial erect, spreading or climbing shrub, which can reach 3 metres (9.8 ft) in height. The stems are twining, zig-zagged and end in spines. The stem surface is smooth and faintly ridged, initially a purple-brown colour, later fading to grey.

The zig-zagged branches and the spines are reflexed or downturned, and the branches then curve outwards (unlike those of Asparagus suaveolens).

Groups of straight-to-curved, reflexed, 5 millimetres (0.20 in) spines radiate from each node along the stem. These spines are in groups of 3, 5 or 7, and the lateral ones usually have growth nodes on them (unlike the smooth spines of Asparagus capensis).

Groups of extremely small (maximum 3 millimetres (0.12 in) long) leaves radiate from each node on the branches. The leaf clusters are spreading or ascending. Each leaf is cylindrical, tapering at both ends.

The white flowers appear in autumn, on stalks (unlike the sessile flowers of Asparagus capensis) and are very fragrant. The fruits are extremely small berries (3 millimetres (0.12 in)) that do not change colour when they ripen (i.e. they stay green).

=== Related species ===
This species is part of a group of closely related southern African Asparagus species, that are all erect-spreading shrublets with non-tuberous roots and woody stems. These species have fascicled spines that are axial in origin (modified branch-tips). Their branchlets and small cylindrical leaves are also fascicled (appearing in groups or tufts).

Other species in this group include the widespread Asparagus suaveolens and Asparagus capensis, the coastal Asparagus mariae of Agulhas, Asparagus flavicaulis, Asparagus stipulaceus and Asparagus spinescens.

== Distribution ==
This species occurs in the Eastern Cape Province and the Western Cape Province as far west as Stellenbosch. It is common in scrub, renosterveld and karoo vegetation.
