= Tropical biome =

Tropical biome may refer to:

- Tropical rainforest
- Tropical savanna
- Tropical desert
