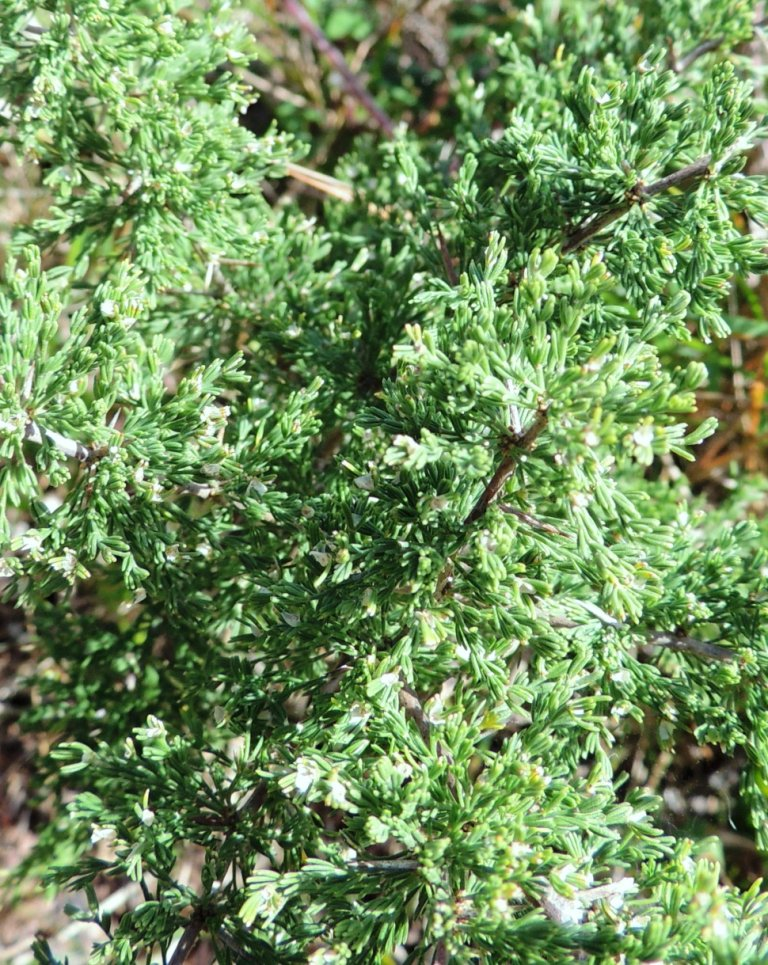

Scientific classification
- Kingdom: Plantae
- Clade: Tracheophytes
- Clade: Angiosperms
- Clade: Monocots
- Order: Asparagales
- Family: Asparagaceae
- Subfamily: Asparagoideae
- Genus: Asparagus
- Species: A. capensis

Binomial name
- Asparagus capensis (L.) Druce

= Asparagus capensis =

Species of shrub

Asparagus capensis, also called katdoring (from the Afrikaans for 'cat-thorn') is a dense, thorny, shrub of the Asparagus genus, that is indigenous to South Africa and Namibia.

== Description ==
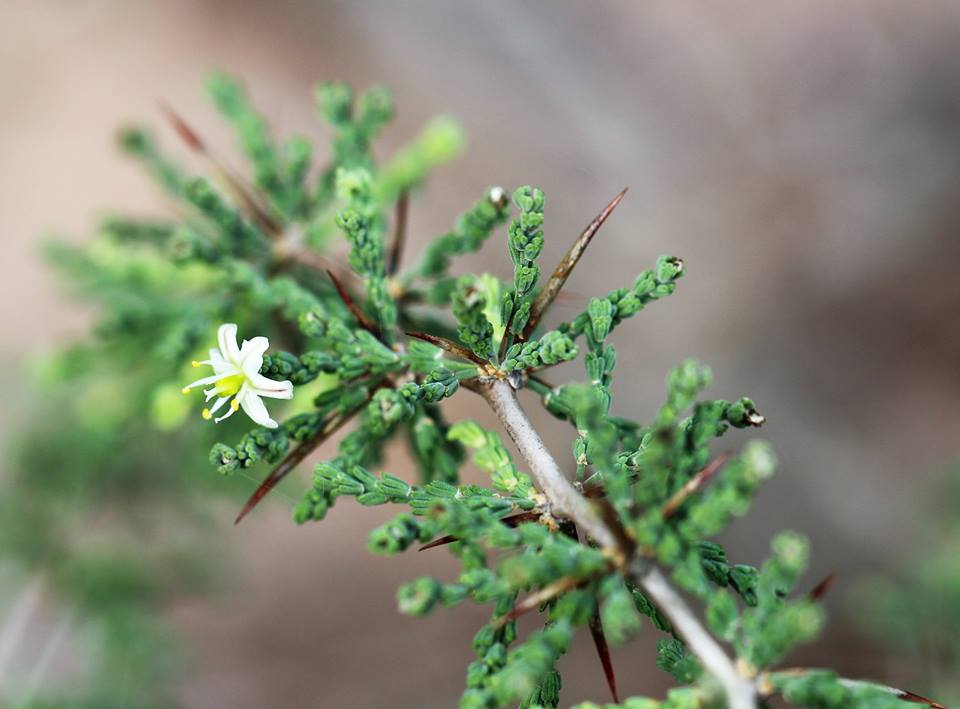
Asparagus capensis, foliage and flower.

This species of asparagus grows as a thorny bush, to a height of 1 metre. Stems are erect, often zig-zagged, and the stems and branches end in spines.

Each branch has many whorls of spreading shoots around it, making it bottle-brush shaped, and each shoot is tightly packed with tiny leaves.

The grey-green leaves are small (3-5mm), velvety, needle-shaped and often appear in sets of five.

The spines at the branch-nodes usually appear in sets of three - a longer central spine (max.30mm) and two lateral spines.

The tiny, white, strongly scented flowers are sessile (without stalks), and they appear from autumn to spring.

=== Related species ===
This species is part of a group of closely related southern African Asparagus species, that are all small, erect shrubs with grouped spines (modified branch-tips) and compound tufts of leaves. Other species in this group include the widespread Asparagus suaveolens and Asparagus burchellii, the coastal Asparagus mariae of Agulhas, Asparagus flavicaulis and Asparagus spinescens.

== Distribution ==
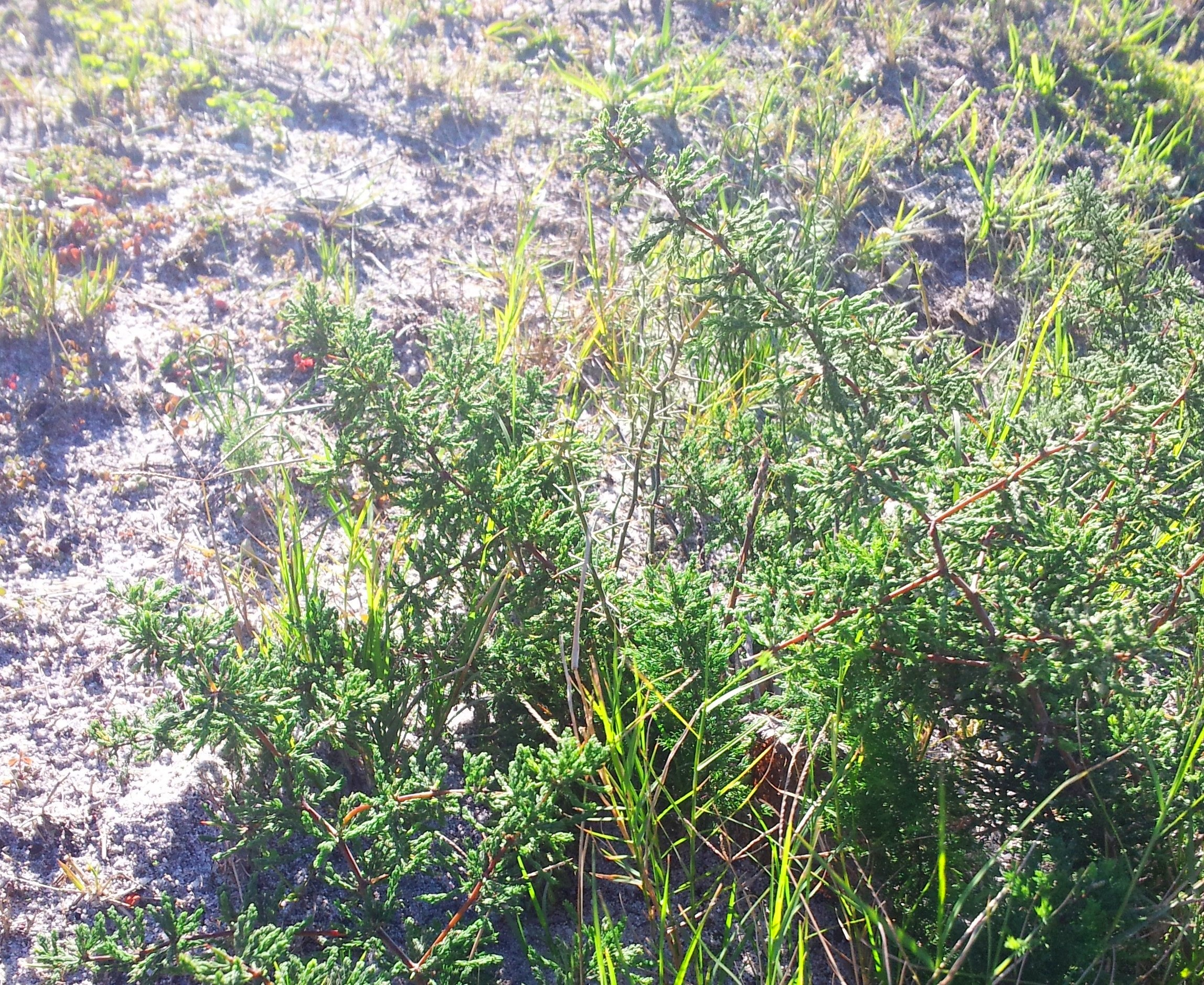
Asparagus capensis growing wild in Cape Town

Its natural range is stony slopes throughout the Cape, from Namibia southwards to Cape Town and eastwards to the Eastern Cape. However, it is especially common in the western winter-rainfall regions. It tends to favour sandy soils and, although it occurs inland, it is most common near the coast.

Like many other Asparagus species, the young shoots of this plant are edible, and are eaten by local people.
