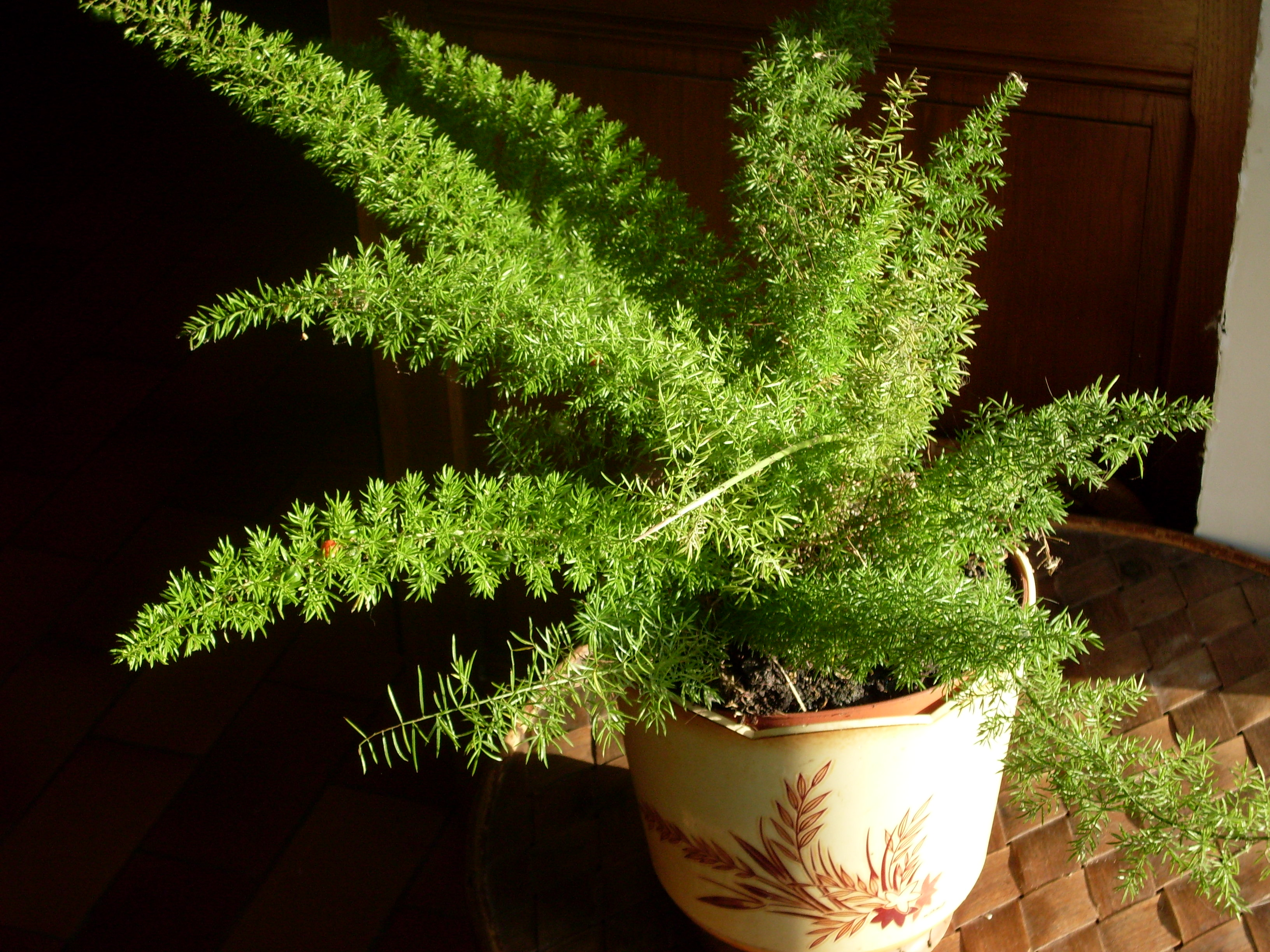
- 'Meyersii' is one of the forms of this variable species that is popular in horticulture

Scientific classification
- Kingdom: Plantae
- Clade: Tracheophytes
- Clade: Angiosperms
- Clade: Monocots
- Order: Asparagales
- Family: Asparagaceae
- Subfamily: Asparagoideae
- Genus: Asparagus
- Species: A. densiflorus

Binomial name
- Asparagus densiflorus (Kunth) Jessop

Synonyms
- Asparagopsis densiflora Kunth; Protasparagus densiflorus (Kunth) Oberm.; Asparagus myriocladus Baker; Asparagus sprengeri Regel; Asparagus sprengeri variegatus Sander

= Asparagus densiflorus =

Species of flowering plant

Asparagus densiflorus (among several species colloquially called asparagus ferns; no relation to actual ferns), or the foxtail fern (asparagus) or plume fern, is a variable, evergreen-perennial plant related to cultivated, edible asparagus.

It is native to southern Africa, from Mozambique to South Africa, but is widely cultivated.

== Related species ==
Foxtail asparagus is part of a group of similar-looking and related Asparagus species native to Africa, including Asparagus aethiopicus ("Sprenger's asparagus"), A. confertus and A. krebsianus. It is mainly found in rocky open forest, savanna thickets and coastal regions of southeastern South Africa. Asparagus densiflorus has been occasionally confused with Asparagus aethiopicus—a different, spikier, more rambling and pendant species—thus some sources provide incorrect information in reference to A. densiflorus. The plant formerly often grown as A. densiflorus var. 'Sprengeri' is, simply, A. densiflorus. Furthermore, the species known as A. densiflorus var. 'Meyersii' remains A. densiflorus, as well.

As a whole, the Asparagus genera is part of a larger botanical order, the Asparagales, which groups together other related plant families such as the agaves, cordylines, dracaenas, orchids, ponytail palms, snake and spider plants, and yuccas (Joshua trees).

== Distribution ==
Asparagus densiflorus is native to the Cape Provinces, KwaZulu-Natal and the Northern Provinces in South Africa, Eswatini (Swaziland) and the Inhaca Islands of Mozambique.

== Cultivation ==
As it cannot tolerate frost, in temperate regions A.densiflorus is usually grown under glass. Numerous cultivars have been developed, of which the compact form 'Meyersii' has gained the Royal Horticultural Society's Award of Garden Merit. Its dense 50 cm (20 in) plumes of foliage are especially valued in flower arranging.
