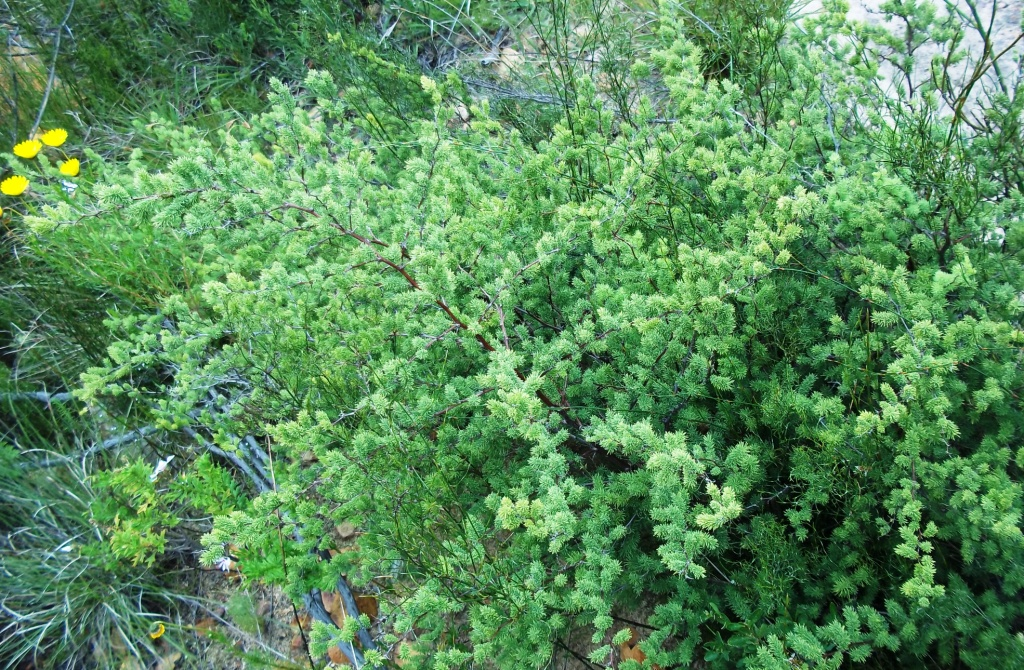

Scientific classification
- Kingdom: Plantae
- Clade: Embryophytes
- Clade: Tracheophytes
- Clade: Spermatophytes
- Clade: Angiosperms
- Clade: Monocots
- Order: Asparagales
- Family: Asparagaceae
- Subfamily: Asparagoideae
- Genus: Asparagus
- Species: A. rubicundus

Binomial name
- Asparagus rubicundus P.J.Bergius (1767)

Synonyms
- Asparagopsis dregei Kunth (1850); Asparagopsis niveniana (Schult. & Schult.f.) Kunth (1850); Asparagopsis thunbergii Kunth (1850), nom. illeg.; Asparagus nitidus J.R.Forst. ex Baker (1896); Asparagus nivenianus Schult. & Schult.f. (1829); Asparagus thunbergianus Schult. & Schult.f. (1829); Protasparagus rubicundus (P.J.Bergius) Oberm. (1983)

= Asparagus rubicundus =

Red-stemmed Asparagus

Species of shrub

Asparagus rubicundus, known as the red-stemmed asparagus, is a fluffy, thorny shrub of the Asparagus genus, that is endemic to the Cape Provinces of South Africa.

== Description ==
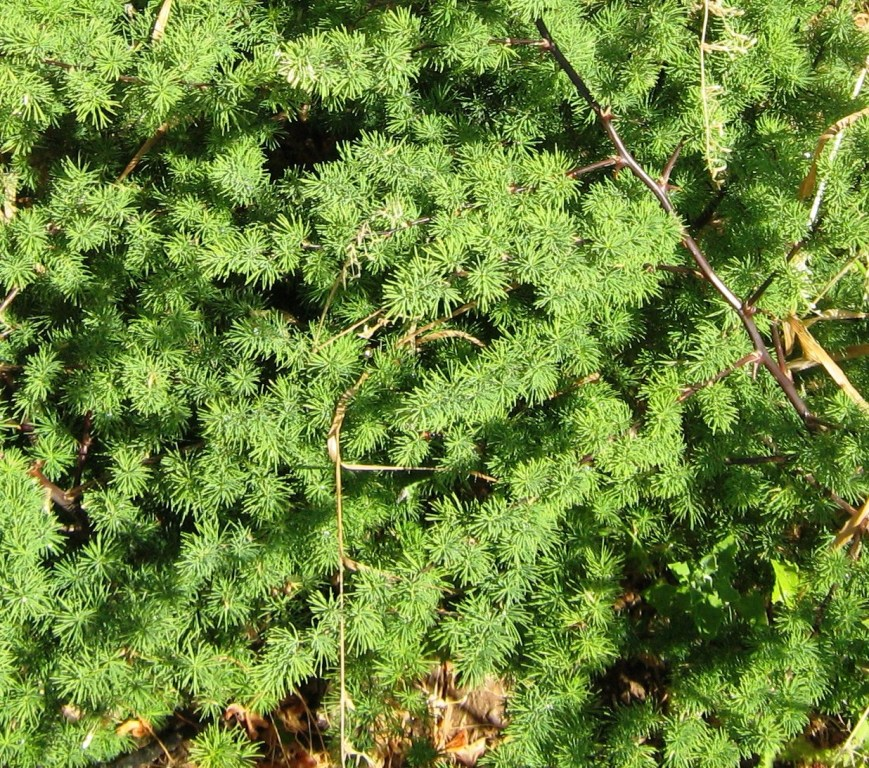
Asparagus rubicundus has tufts of tiny thread-like leaves, along its spiny brown stems

This species of Asparagus grows as a thorny bush, to a height of 1,5 metres.

Stems are erect, round, smooth, shiny and have a distinctive dark-brown colour.

At each node along a stem, below the branch, there is a single, recurved-spreading (max.6mm) thorn.

The numerous, thread-like leaves are in feathery tufts of about 10. Individual leaves are small (3-7mm), linear-cylindrical, slightly curved, and slightly broader towards their tips.

The flowers (March–June) are white, usually solitary, and have brown stamens. The berries are reddish or black, each with a single seed.

The young shoots of this plant are edible, like those of commercial asparagus.

=== Related species ===
This species is part of a group of closely related African Asparagus species, including Asparagus lignosus, Asparagus concinnus and Asparagus microraphis.

== Distribution ==
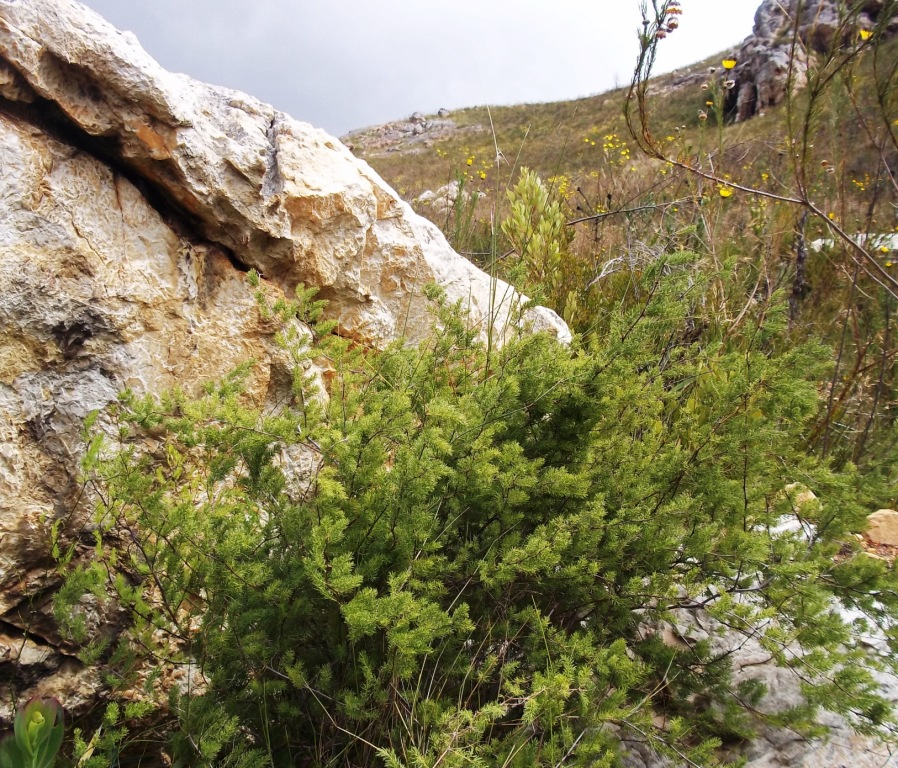
Asparagus rubicundus in habitat, near Greyton.

It occurs throughout the southern and western Cape, as far north as Namibia, and as far east as Uitenhage. It is usually found in coarse sandy, clay or granite-based soil in fynbos or renosterveld vegetation and coastal sand plains.
