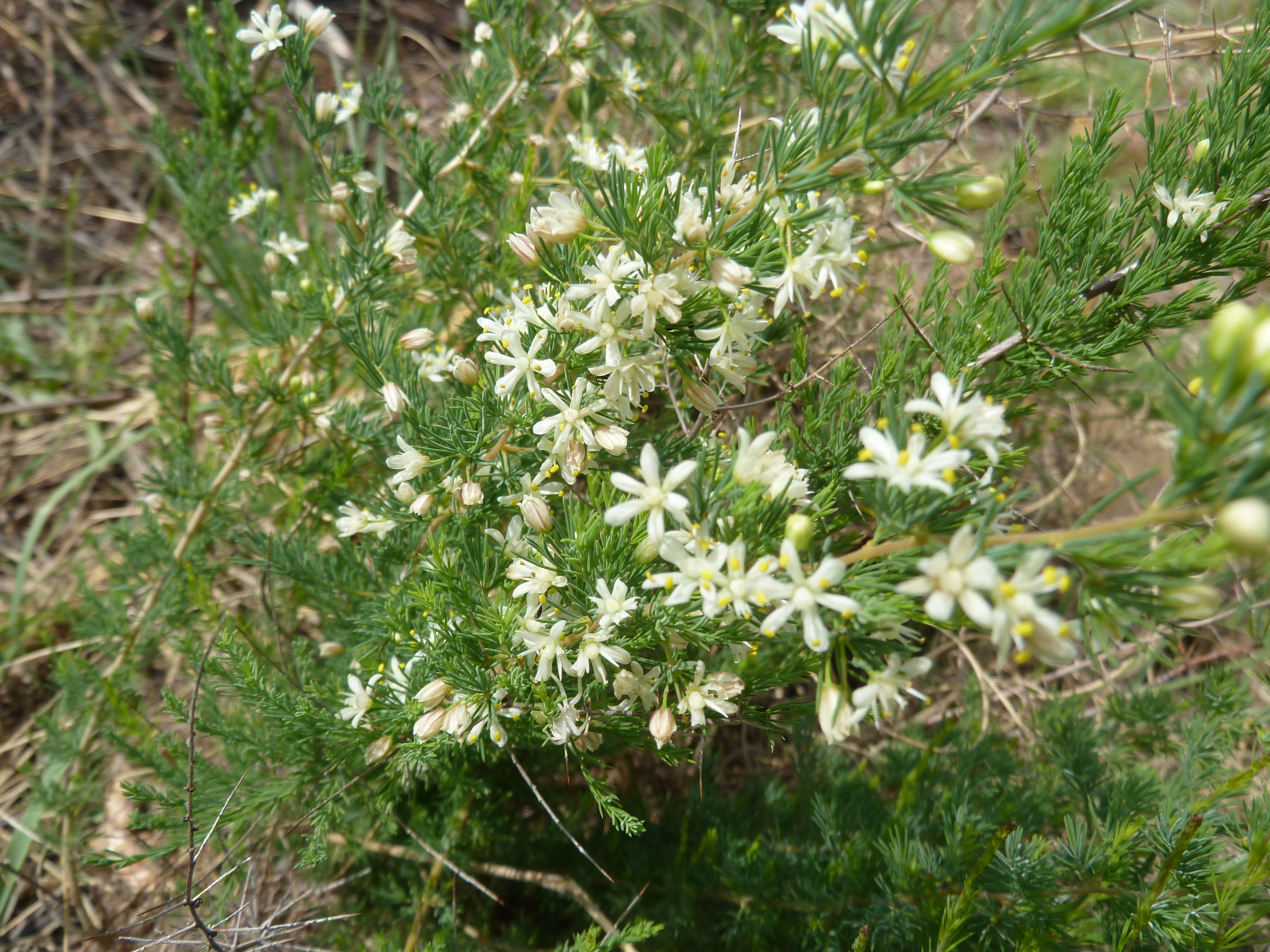

Scientific classification
- Kingdom: Plantae
- Clade: Tracheophytes
- Clade: Angiosperms
- Clade: Monocots
- Order: Asparagales
- Family: Asparagaceae
- Subfamily: Asparagoideae
- Genus: Asparagus
- Species: A. suaveolens

Binomial name
- Asparagus suaveolens Burch.

= Asparagus suaveolens =

Species of shrub

Asparagus suaveolens ("Bushveld Asparagus" or "Mvane"), is a shrub of the Asparagus genus, that is indigenous to rocky areas in Africa, from Kenya to South Africa.

== Description ==
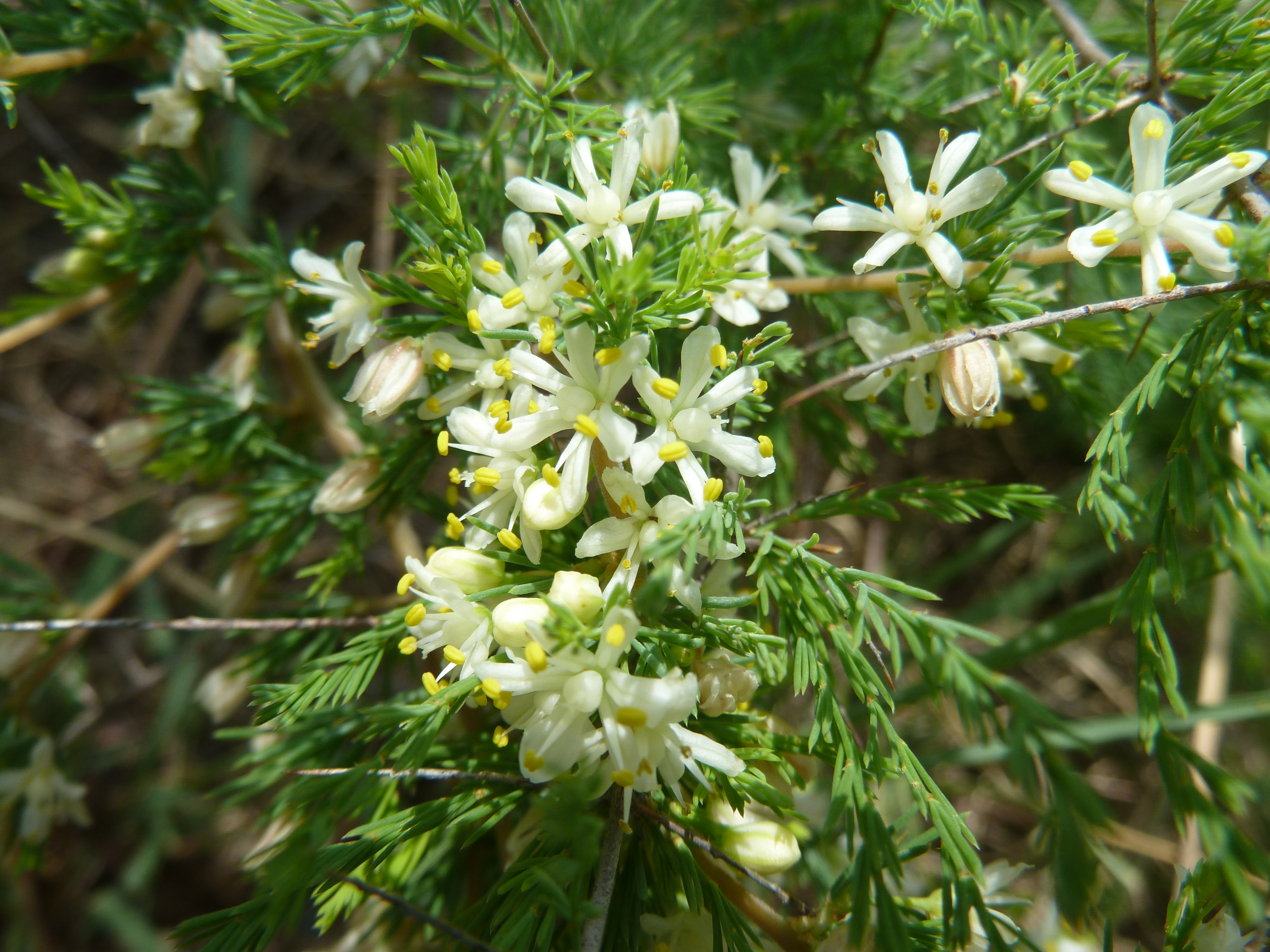
Detail of flowers and leaf tufts

A perennial erect to spreading shrub, reaching 1 metre (3.3 ft) in height. The stems are brush-like, zig-zagged and end in spines. The stem surface is smooth or faintly downy. In colour, the stems are brown to pale cream or grey.

The branchlets and spines are not as prominently reflexed as those of the closely related Asparagus burchellii.

Groups of straight-to-curved spines radiate from each node along the stem. These spines are in groups of 2 or 3, and the lateral ones usually have tiny, reduced growth nodes on them (unlike the smooth spines of Asparagus capensis).

Groups of 1-6 extremely small leaves radiate from each node on the branches. The leaf clusters are spreading or ascending. Each leaf is cylindrical, tapering at both ends.

The solitary flowers are on stalks (unlike the sessile flowers of Asparagus capensis) and are very fragrant. The white obovate tepals are spreading and filaments are spreading, with orange-yellow stamens. The fruits are small, single-seed berries that ripen to a red or black colour.

=== Related species ===
This species is part of a group of closely related southern African Asparagus species, that are all small, erect shrubs with grouped spines (modified branch-tips) and compound tufts of leaves.

Other species in this group include the widespread Asparagus burchellii and Asparagus capensis, the coastal Asparagus mariae of Agulhas, Asparagus flavicaulis, Asparagus stipulaceus and Asparagus spinescens.

Asparagus suaveolens closely resembles the related Asparagus burchellii. However, the flowers of 'suaveolens are solitary, while burchellii has up to three flowers born on a small disc at the tip of the branchlet. The branchlets and spines of burchellii are strongly reflexed, and it also usually has a more spreading, climbing growth habit.
