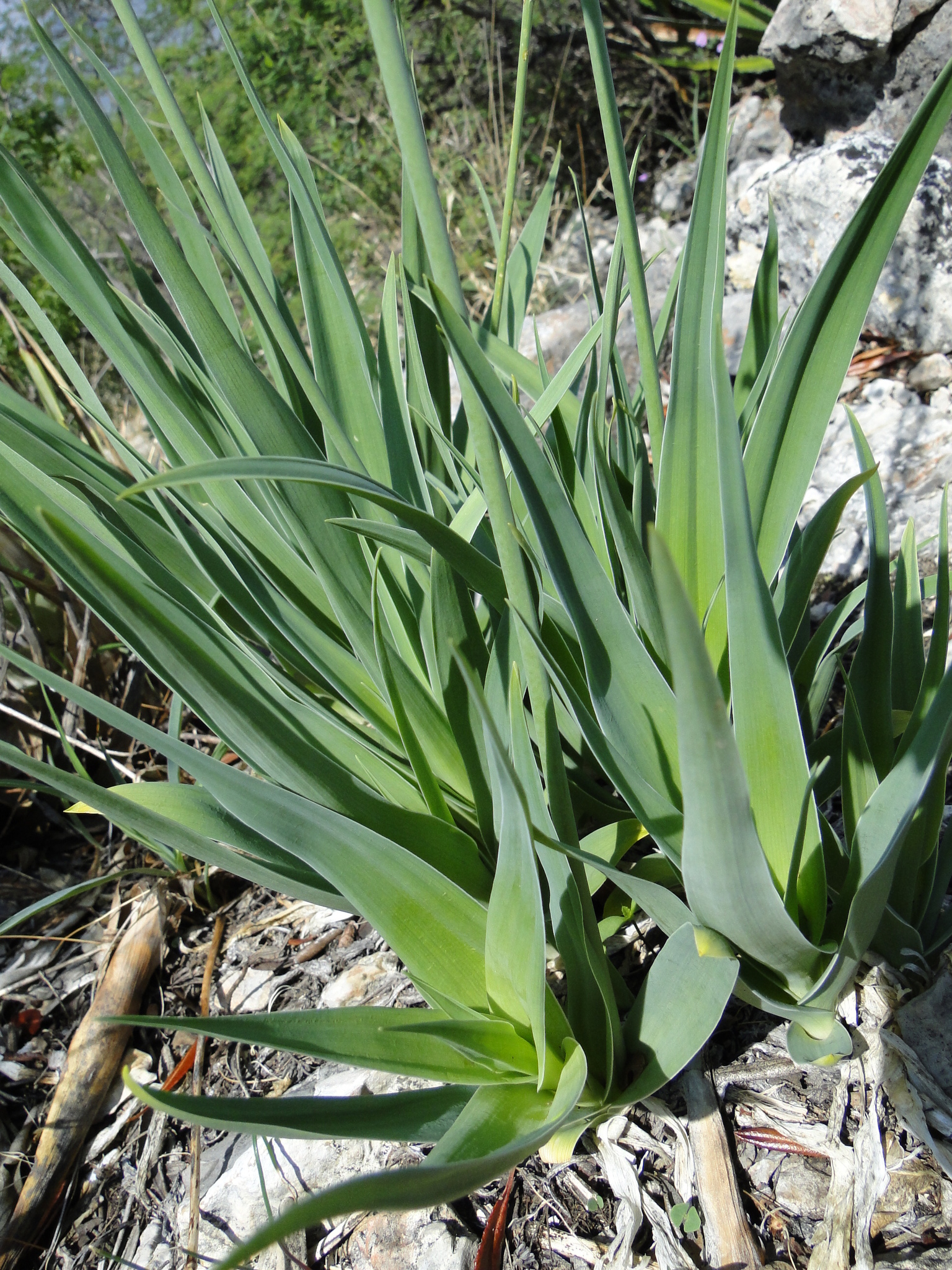
- Hemiphylacus mahindae

Scientific classification
- Kingdom: Plantae
- Clade: Tracheophytes
- Clade: Angiosperms
- Clade: Monocots
- Order: Asparagales
- Family: Asparagaceae
- Subfamily: Asparagoideae
- Genus: Hemiphylacus; S.Watson

Type species
- Hemiphylacus latifolius S.Watson

= Hemiphylacus =

Genus of flowering plants

Hemiphylacus is a genus of flowering plants endemic to Mexico. In the APG III classification system, it is placed in the family Asparagaceae, subfamily Asparagoideae (formerly the family Asparagaceae sensu stricto).

Species:

- Hemiphylacus alatostylus L.Hern. - Guanajuto, Querétaro, San Luis Potosí
- Hemiphylacus hintoniorum L.Hern. - Nuevo León
- Hemiphylacus latifolius S.Watson - Coahuila
- Hemiphylacus mahindae L.Hern. - Oaxaca, Puebla
- Hemiphylacus novogalicianus L.Hern. - Aguascalientes
