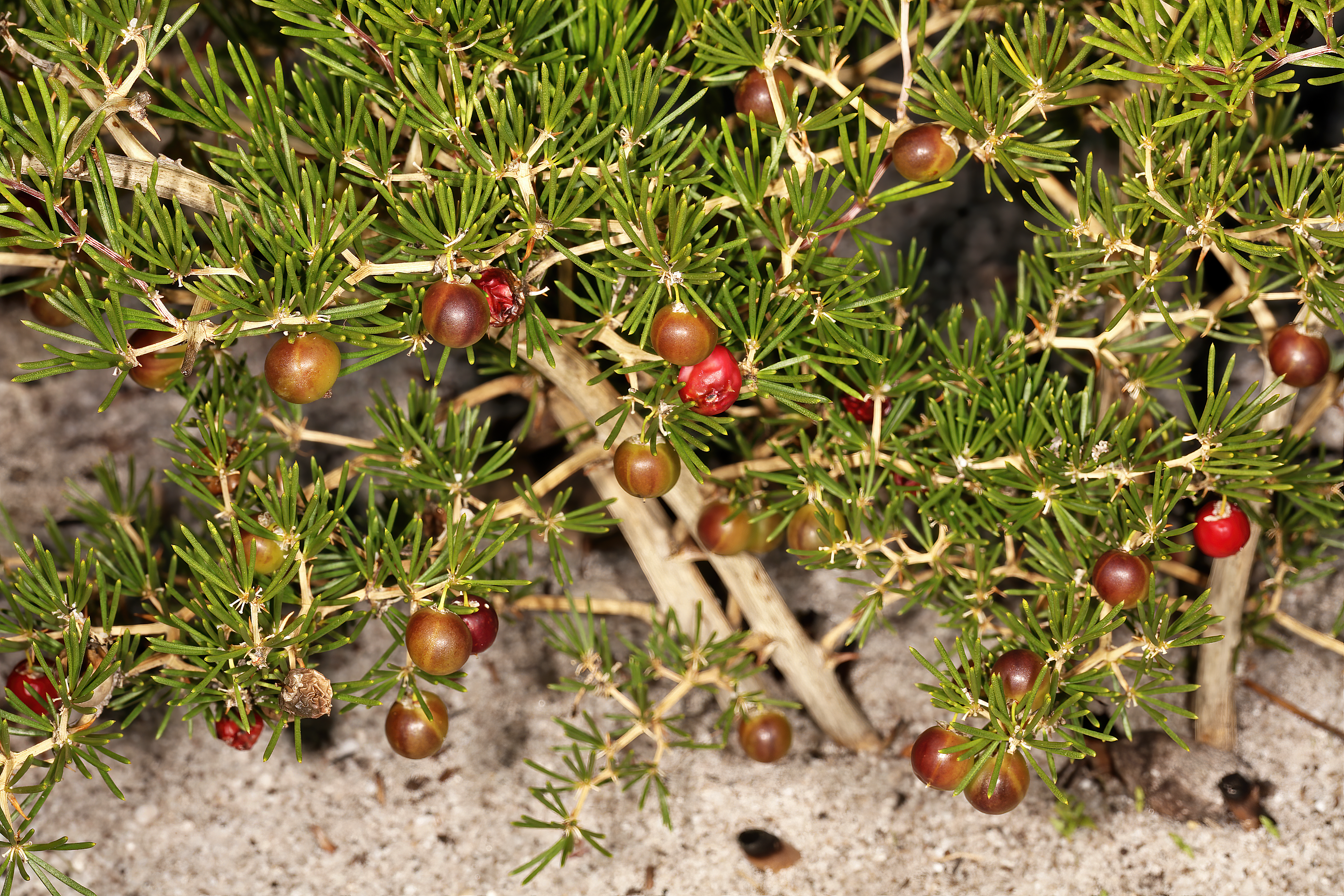
- Asparagus lignosus has pale-to-white branches and tufts of cylindrical leaves.

Scientific classification
- Kingdom: Plantae
- Clade: Tracheophytes
- Clade: Angiosperms
- Clade: Monocots
- Order: Asparagales
- Family: Asparagaceae
- Subfamily: Asparagoideae
- Genus: Asparagus
- Species: A. lignosus

Binomial name
- Asparagus lignosus Burm.f.

= Asparagus lignosus =

Species of vine

Asparagus lignosus ("Katdoring") is a thorny, spindly creeper of the Asparagus genus, that is indigenous to the Western Cape Province of South Africa.

== Description ==
A rigid, upright shrub reaching 80 cm in height. The branches are zig-zagged, and pale grey-green to white.

At each node along the branch, there is a single recurved 5mm thorn.

The stiff, linear (length 10-20mm), cylindrical, spine-tipped leaves are in tufts.

The flowers are white with a green strip on each tepal. The anthers are orange. They appear singly or in pairs.

=== Related species ===
This species is part of a group of closely related African Asparagus species, including Asparagus rubicundus, Asparagus concinnus and Asparagus microraphis.

== Distribution ==
This species is indigenous to the Western Cape Province, South Africa.

Its distribution is from Clanwilliam in the far north-west and Cape Town in the west, eastwards across the Little Karoo and Overberg regions, as far as Mossel Bay in the south-east.

It occurs in rocky sandstone slopes, as well as rocky loamy soils in fynbos or renosterveld vegetation on lower slopes and flats.
