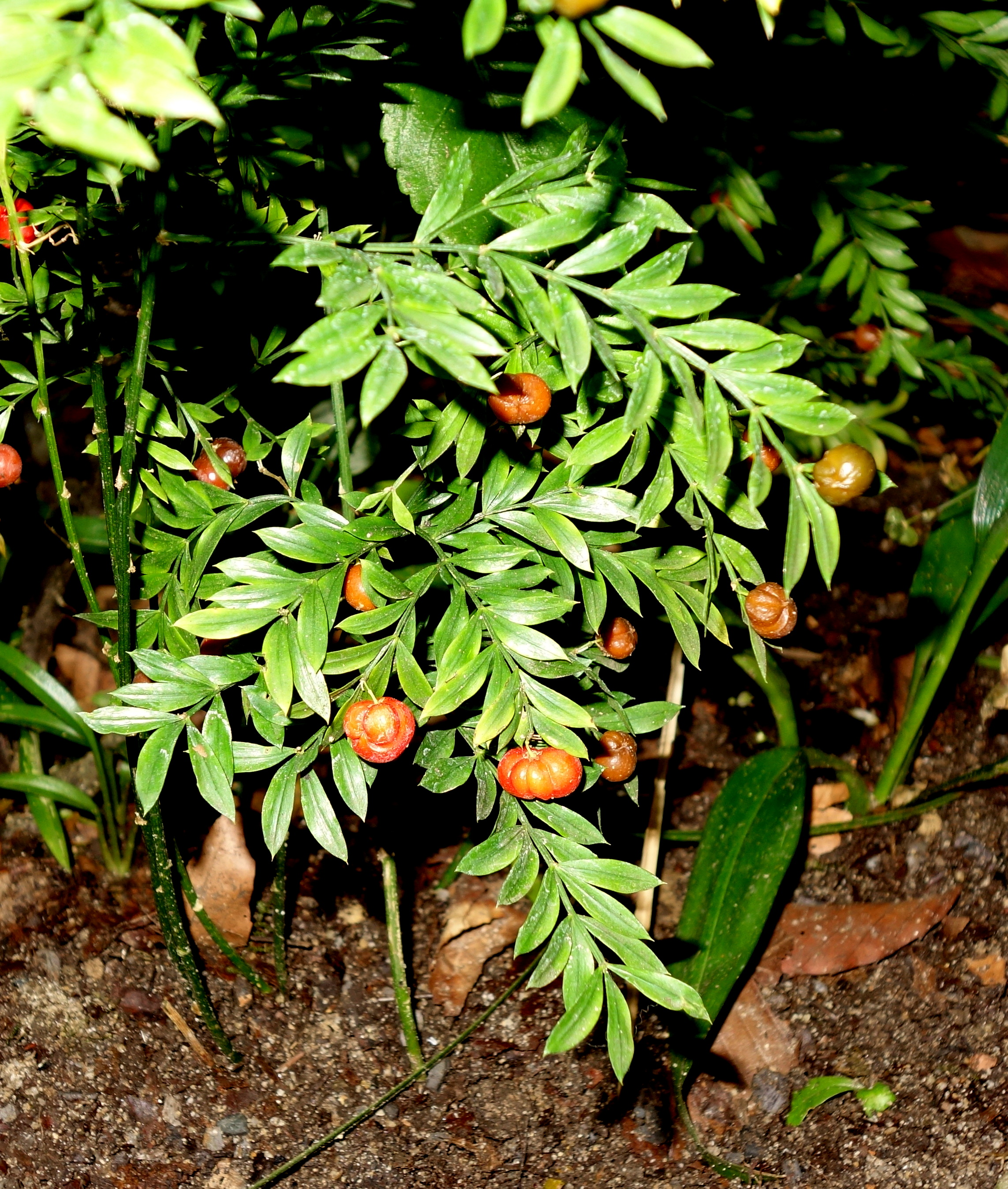

Scientific classification
- Kingdom: Plantae
- Clade: Tracheophytes
- Clade: Angiosperms
- Clade: Monocots
- Order: Asparagales
- Family: Asparagaceae
- Subfamily: Asparagoideae
- Genus: Asparagus
- Species: A. simulans

Binomial name
- Asparagus simulans Baker

Synonyms
- Asparagus madagascariensis Baker; Asparagus rusciformis Brongn. ex H.Perrier; Asparagus ternatus Brongn. ex H.Perrier

= Asparagus simulans =

Species of flowering plant

Asparagus simulans is a species of flowering plant in the family Asparagaceae that is native to Madagascar. Asparagus simulans was described by English botanist John Gilbert Baker in 1875.
