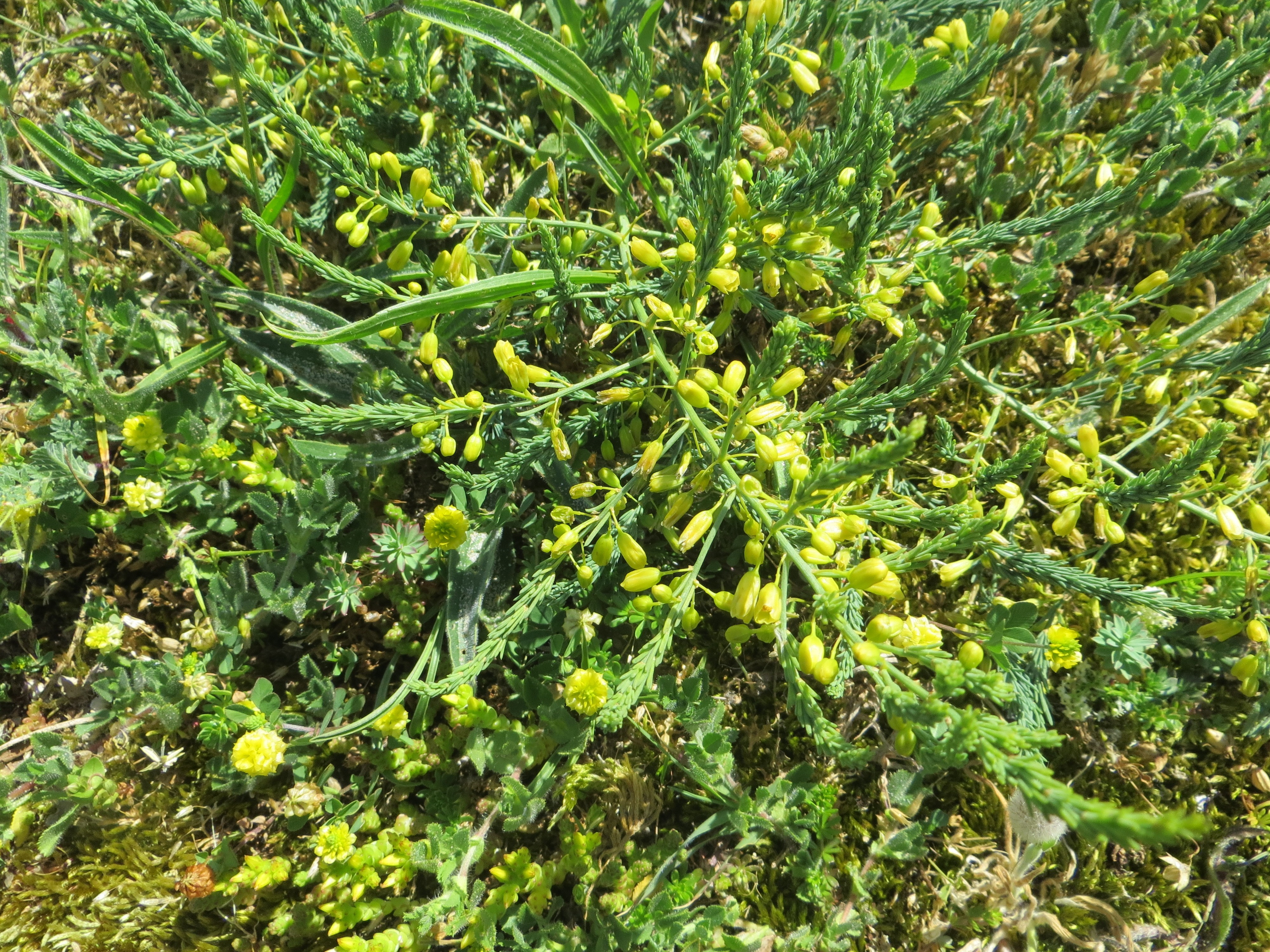

Scientific classification
- Kingdom: Plantae
- Clade: Tracheophytes
- Clade: Angiosperms
- Clade: Monocots
- Order: Asparagales
- Family: Asparagaceae
- Subfamily: Asparagoideae
- Genus: Asparagus
- Species: A. prostratus

Binomial name
- Asparagus prostratus K. Richt

Synonyms
- Asparagus altilis subsp. prostratus (Dumort.) K.Richt.; Asparagus officinalis subsp. prostratus (Dumort.) Corb.; Asparagus officinalis proles prostratus (Dumort.) Rouy; Asparagus officinalis var. prostratus (Dumort.) Nyman

= Asparagus prostratus =

Wild asparagus

Species of flowering plant

Asparagus prostratus, also known as wild asparagus, is a species of flowering plant from the genus Asparagus and family Asparagaceae.

It has been placed onto the UK Biodiversity Action Plan list of priority species.

== Description ==
A. prostratus is a perennial species. It has a prostrate growth habit and needle like leaves that can reach up to 2.4 cm long. A. prostratus stems grow from rhizomes. It produces small, yellow, bell-shaped flowers. Berries start off green and begin to turn red between July and October. The berries are toxic to humans and cause diarrhoea and vomiting.

== Reproduction ==
A. prostratus is a dioecious species, with plants being either male or female. Colonies of this species therefore require both male and female plants for successful sexual reproduction. Plants will flower from May and June. Flowers are pollinated by insects. Once pollinated plants will produce berries. Berries are eaten by animals such as birds, which help disperse the seeds.

A. prostratus can also clone itself asexually. Stems sprout from rhizomes that spread horizontally beneath the soil, which helps the plant reproduce through vegetative reproduction. This allows the species to reproduce when either male or female plants are absent.

== Distribution ==
This species is endemic to Europe, where it has been recorded on the coastlines of: Belgium, the Channel Islands, Denmark, France, Germany, Ireland, Spain, the United Kingdom and the Netherlands.

It is believed the species may be extinct in Germany.

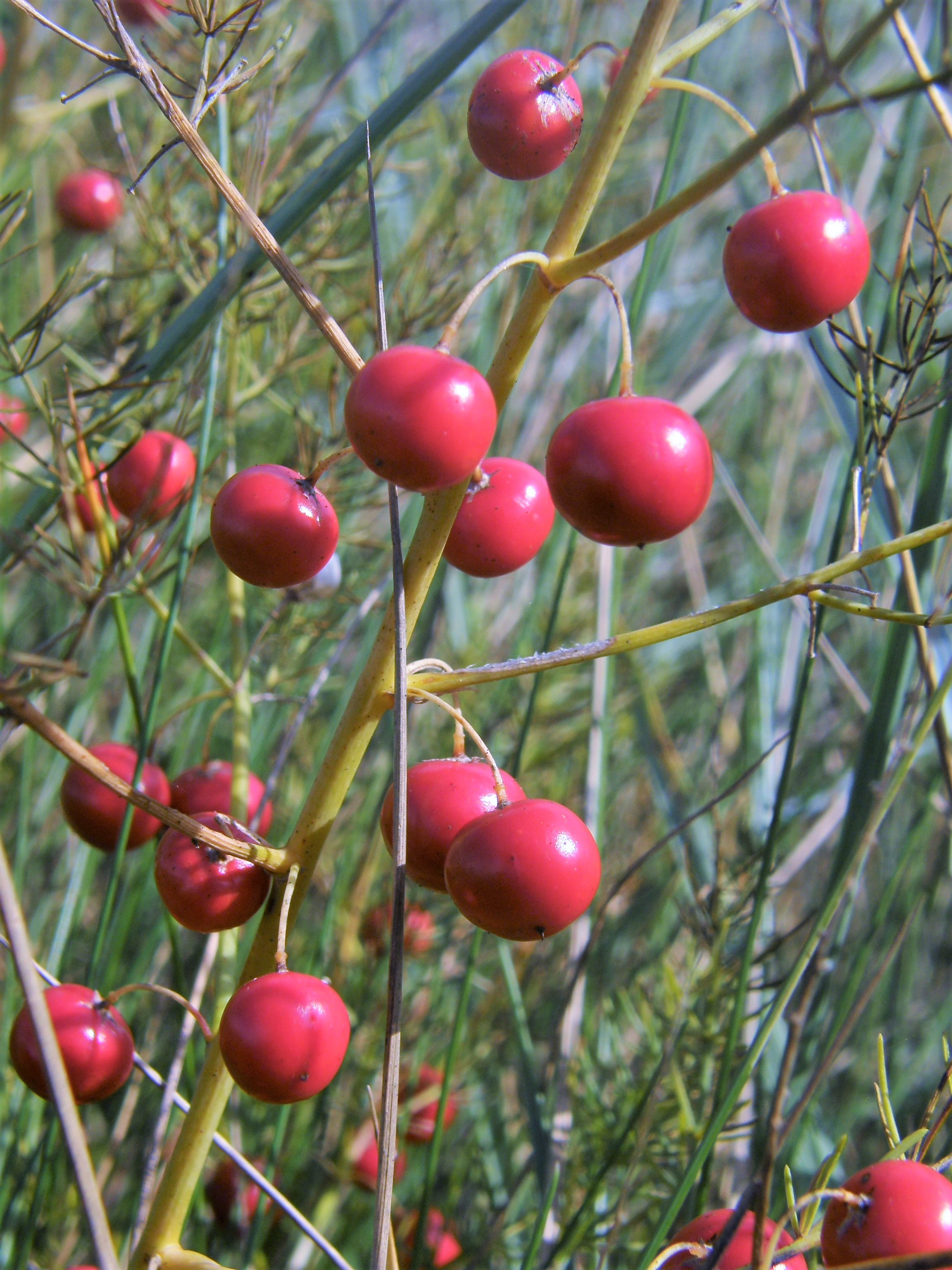
Asparagus prostratus ripe berries

== Habitat ==
A. prostratus can be found growing in coastal habitats such as cliffs, sand dunes and shingle beaches.

== Threats ==
Isolation between male and female plants on different sites prevents successful pollination and seed production. This causes plants to rely on asexual vegetative reproduction, creating genetic copies of themselves. Genetic diversity is important as it helps plant species adapt to changing environments. Lowered genetic diversity puts populations at risk as they are less likely to be able to adapt to threats such as disease or climate change.

The non-native plant species Carpobrotus edulis has escaped to coastal habitats where it outcompetes native species such as A. prostratus. It was originally introduced into the United Kingdom as a garden plant during the 1690s. It has colonized cliffs where it has to be removed by National Trust wardens.

Coastal erosion causes loss of habitat for A. prostratus. Cliff and sand dune habitats can be damaged by erosion.

== Gallery ==
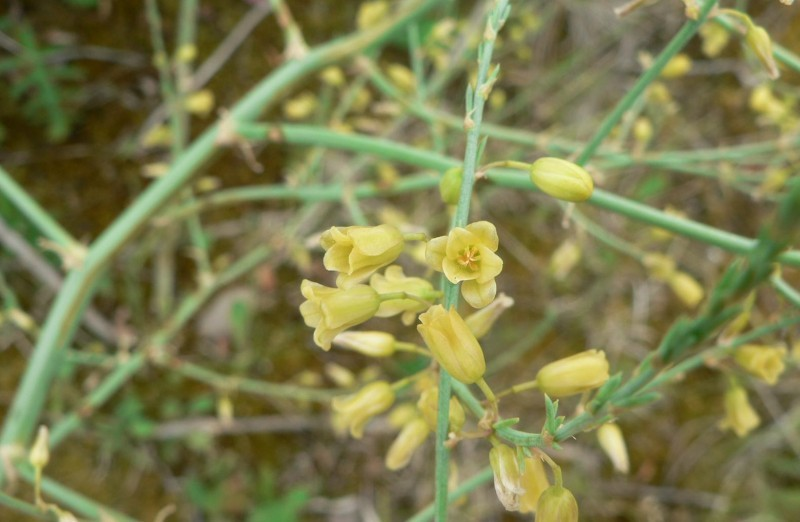
Asparagus prostratus flowers

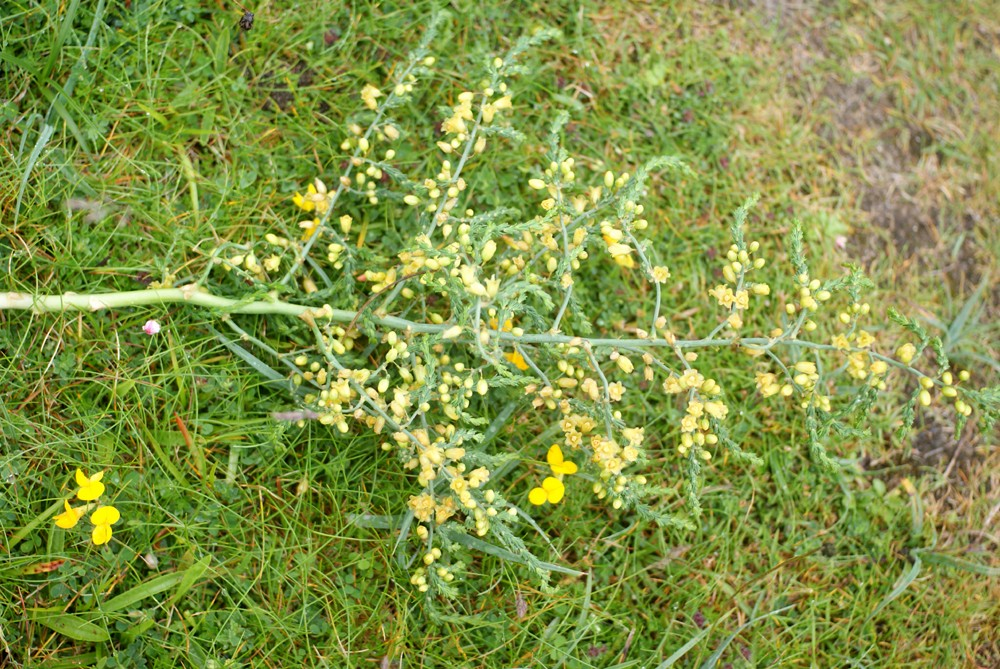
Asparagus prostratus growth habit

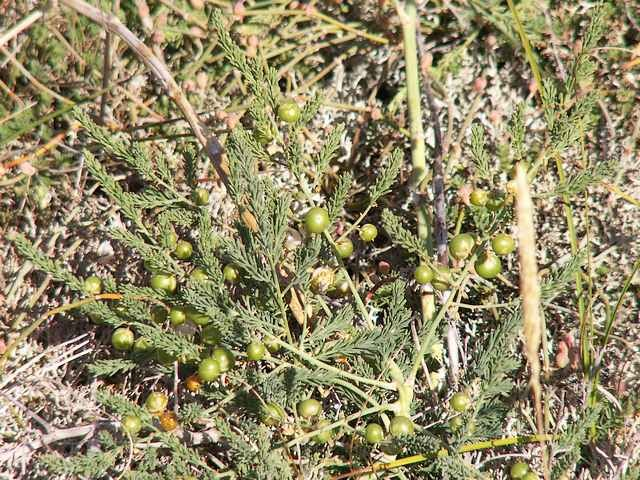
Asparagus prostratus with unripe, green berries
