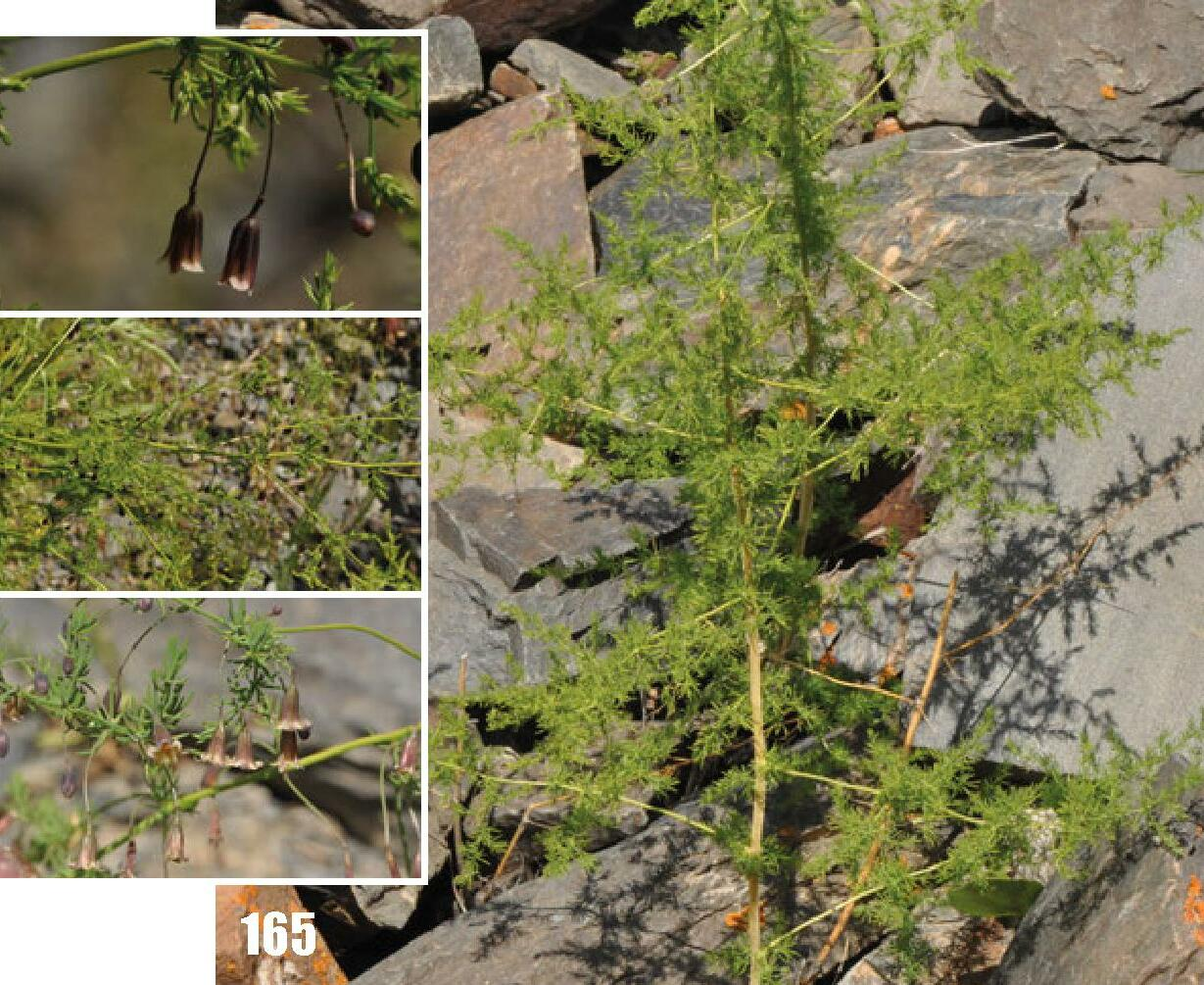

Scientific classification
- Kingdom: Plantae
- Clade: Tracheophytes
- Clade: Angiosperms
- Clade: Monocots
- Order: Asparagales
- Family: Asparagaceae
- Subfamily: Asparagoideae
- Genus: Asparagus
- Species: A. neglectus

Binomial name
- Asparagus neglectus Kar. & Kir.

Synonyms
- Asparagus flexuosus (Ledeb.) Krylov; Asparagus misczenkoi Iljin

= Asparagus neglectus =

Species of flowering plant

Asparagus neglectus is a species of Asparagus native to temperate Asia.
