= Tropical desert =

Type of desert

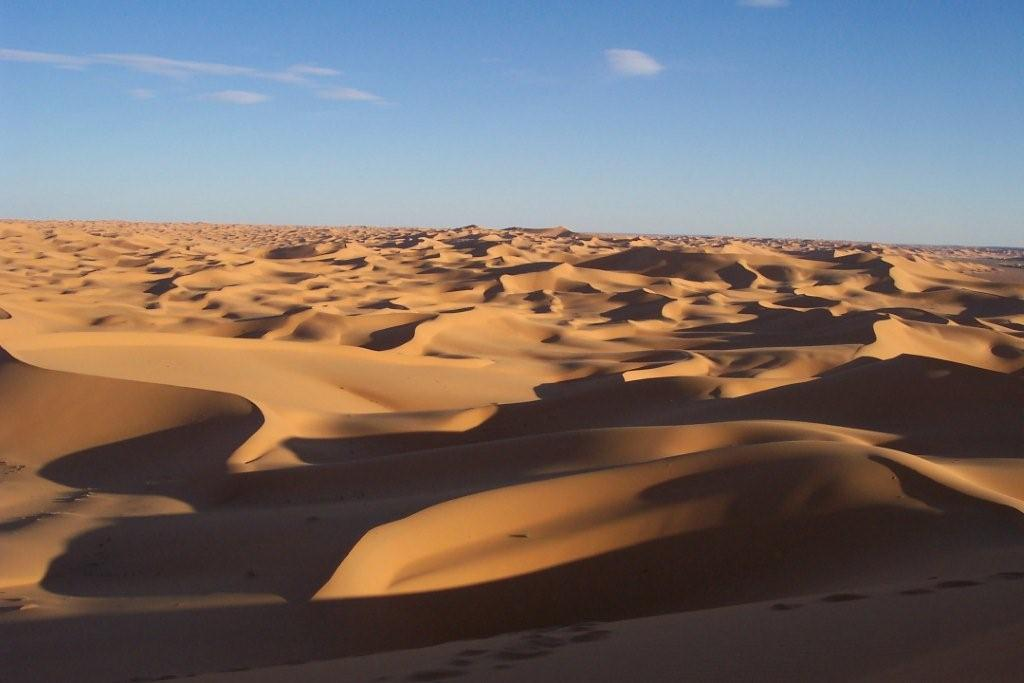
A view of the Sahara

Tropical deserts are located in regions roughly between 0 and 30 degrees latitude. The environment is very extreme, and they have the highest average monthly temperature on Earth. Rainfall is sporadic; precipitation may not be observed at all in a few years. In addition to these extreme environmental and climate conditions, most tropical deserts are covered with sand and rocks, and thus too flat and lacking in vegetation to block out the wind. Wind may erode and transport sand, rocks and other materials; these are known as eolian processes. Landforms caused by wind erosion vary greatly in characteristics and size. Representative landforms include depressions and pans, Yardangs, inverted topography and ventifacts. No significant populations can survive in tropical deserts due to extreme aridity, heat and the paucity of vegetation; only specific flora and fauna with special behavioral and physical mechanisms are supported. Although tropical deserts are considered to be harsh and barren, they are in fact important sources of natural resources and play a significant role in economic development. Besides the equatorial deserts, there are many hot deserts situated in the tropical zone.

== Distribution ==
=== Geographical distribution ===
Tropical deserts are located in both continental interiors and coastal areas between the Tropic of Cancer and Tropic of Capricorn. Representative deserts include the Sahara Desert in North Africa, the Australian Desert in Western and Southern Australia, Arabian Desert and Syrian Desert in Western Asia, the Kalahari Desert in Southern Africa, Sonoran Desert in the United States and Mexico, Mojave Desert in the United States, Thar Desert in India and Pakistan, Dasht-e Margo and Registan Desert in Afghanistan and Dasht-e Kavir and Dasht-e Loot in Iran.

=== Controlling factor ===
Tropics form a belt around the equator from latitude 3 degrees north to latitude 3 degrees south, which is called the Intertropical Convergence Zone. Tropical heat generates unstable air in this area, and air masses become extremely dry due to the loss of moisture during the process of tropical ascent.

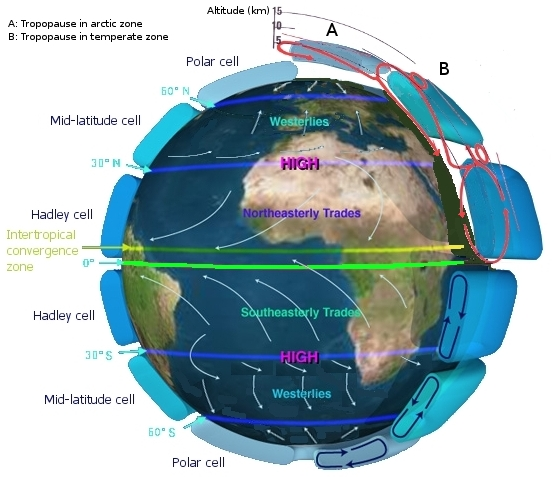
Hadley cell above Sahara desert

Another significant determinant of tropical desert climates are Hadley cells. Hadley cells concentrate all precipitations in the hotter, more humid, lower pressure equators, leaving colder higher pressure deserts with no precipitation.

== Characteristics ==
=== Temperature ===
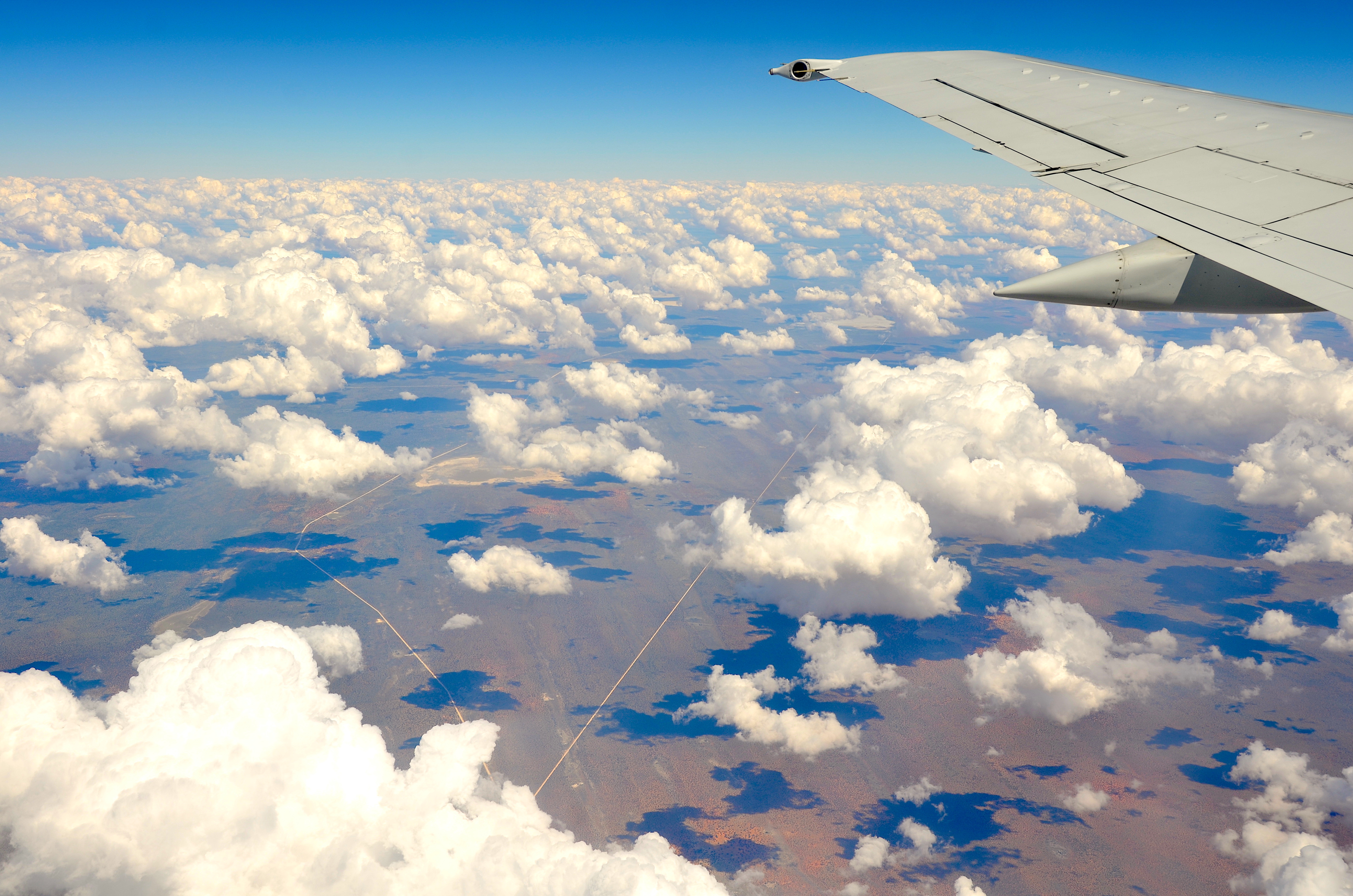
Spare clouds

Tropical deserts have the highest average daily temperature on the planet, as both the energy input during the day and the loss of heat at night are large. This phenomenon causes an extremely large daily temperature range. Specifically, temperatures in a low elevation inland desert can reach 40°C to 50°C during the day, and drop to approximately 5°C at night; the daily range is around 30 to 40°C.

There are some other reasons for significant changes in temperature in tropical deserts. For instance, a lack of water and vegetation on the ground can enhance the absorption of the heat due to insolation. Subsiding air from dominant high pressure areas in a cloud-free sky can also lead to large amounts of insolation; a cloudless sky enables day temperature to escape rapidly at night.

Precipitation is very irregular in tropical deserts. The average annual precipitation in low latitude deserts is less than 250 mm. Relative humidity is very low – only 10% to 30% in interior locations, and even the dewpoints are typically very low, often being well below the freezing mark. Some deserts do not have rainfall all year round, they are located far from the ocean. High-pressure cells and high temperatures can also increase the level of aridity.

=== Wind ===
Wind greatly contributes to aridity in tropical deserts. If wind speed exceeds 80 km/h, it can generate dust storms and sandstorms and erode the rocky surface. Therefore, wind plays an important role in shaping various landforms. This phenomenon is known as the eolian process. There are two types of eolian process: deflation and abrasion.

First, deflation may cause the light lowering of the ground surface, leading to deflation hollows, plains, basins, blowouts, wind-eroded plains and parabolic dunes. Second, the eolian process leads to abrasion, which forms special landforms with a significant undercut.

=== Landforms ===
Various landforms are found in tropical deserts due to different kinds of eolian processes. The major landforms are dunes, depressions, pans, yardangs, and inverted topography.

==== Dunes ====
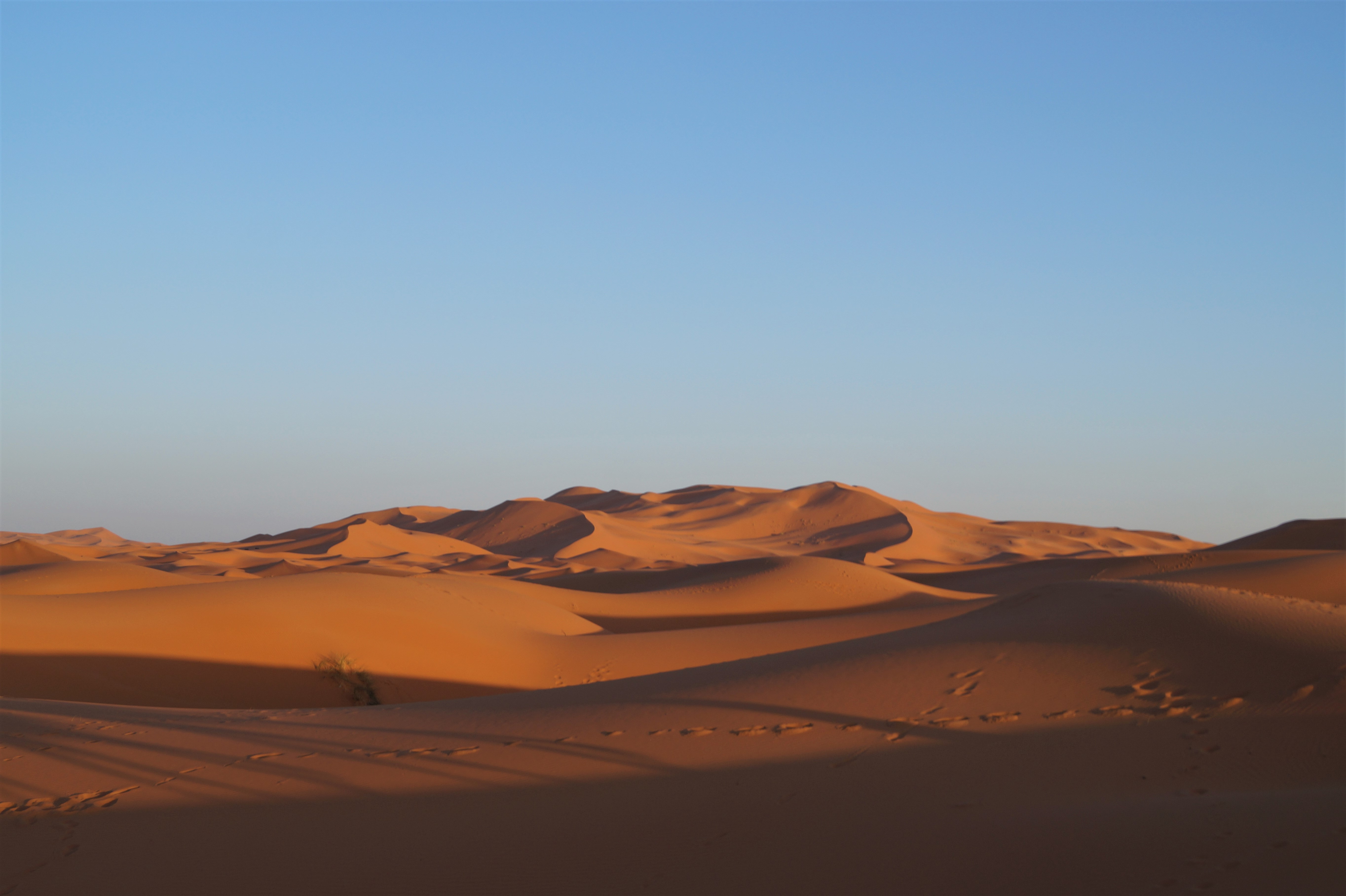
Dunes

There are various kinds of dune in tropical deserts. Representative dunes include dome dunes, transverse dunes, barchans, star dunes, shadow dunes, linear dunes and longitudinal dunes.

==== Depression ====
A desert depression is caused by polygenetic factors such as wind erosion, broad shallow warping and block faulting, stream erosion, karst activity, salt weathering mass wasting, and zoogenic processes; representative examples are the large enclosed basins in Africa, such as Farafra, Baharia, Dakhla, Qattara, Siwa and Kargha.

==== Pans ====
Pans are widespread in southern and western Australia, southern Africa and the high plains of the United States deserts. The factors responsible for pans include a vegetation-free surface and low humidity, a low water table and poorly consolidated sediment, and a huge amount of fine-grained sandstone and shale. Feedback mechanisms also play a significant role in the process of enlarging the pan; salts are left as water accumulates in depressions, which inhibits sedimentation due to weather and the growth of vegetation in the future. This affects both erosional processes and depositional processes in pans.

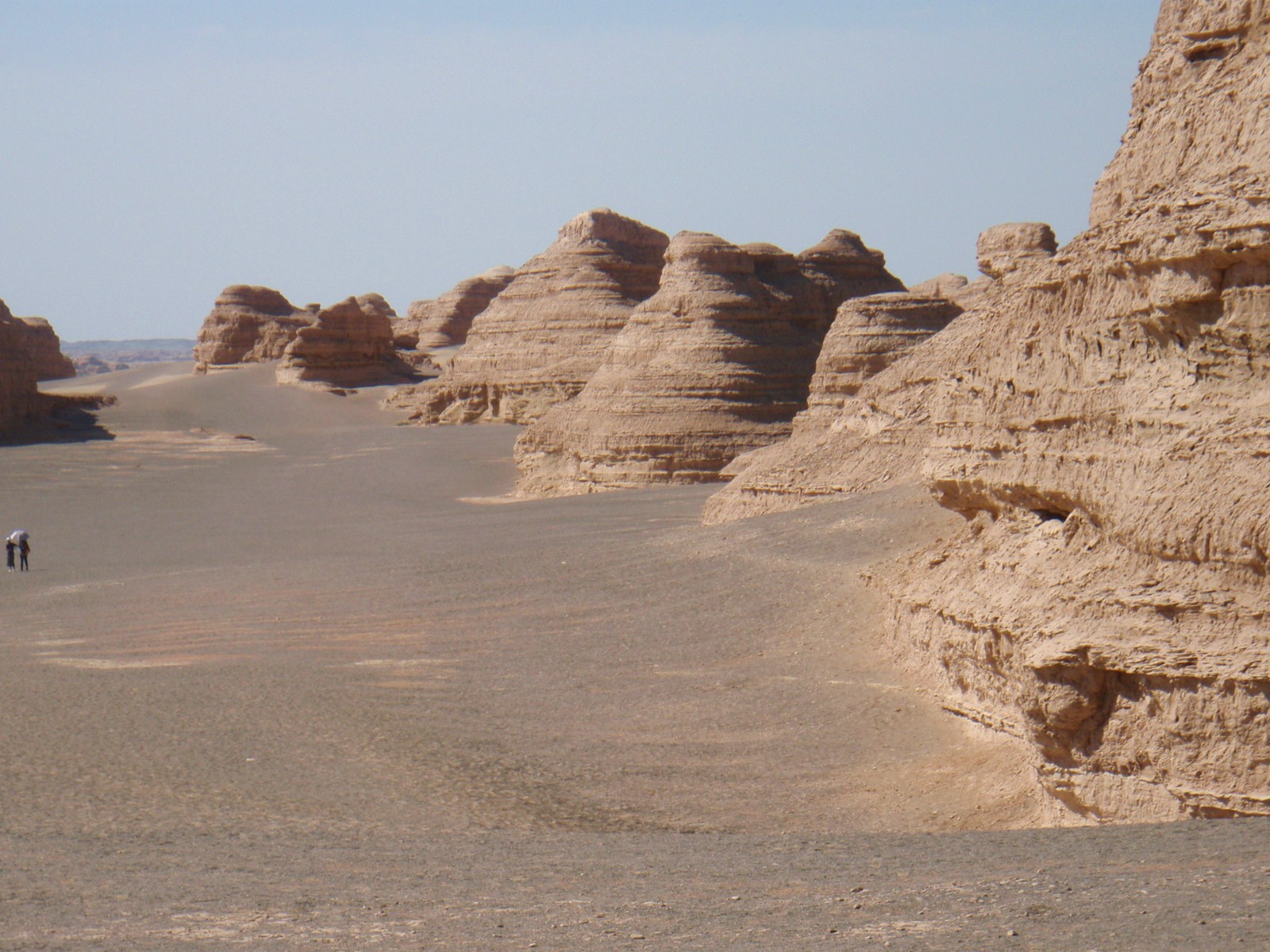
Yardangs

==== Yardangs ====
Yardangs can be observed in orbital and aerial images of Mars and Earth. Yardangs usually develop in arid regions, predominantly due to wind processes. The classic forms are streamlined and elongated ridges; they may also appear with flat tops or with stubby and short profiles. Their length-to-width ratios range from 3:1 to 10:1; this is determined by the wind direction, duration of exposure to wind and rock material.

==== Inverted topography ====
Inverted topography forms in areas previously at a low elevation, such as deltaic distributary systems and river systems. They are left at higher relief due to their relative resistance to wind erosion. Inverted topography is frequently observed in yardang fields, such as raised channels in Egypt, Oman and China and on Mars.

== Biogeography ==
The environment in tropical deserts is harsh as well as barren; only certain plants and animals with special behavioral and physical mechanisms can live there.

=== Biological adaptation to aridity ===
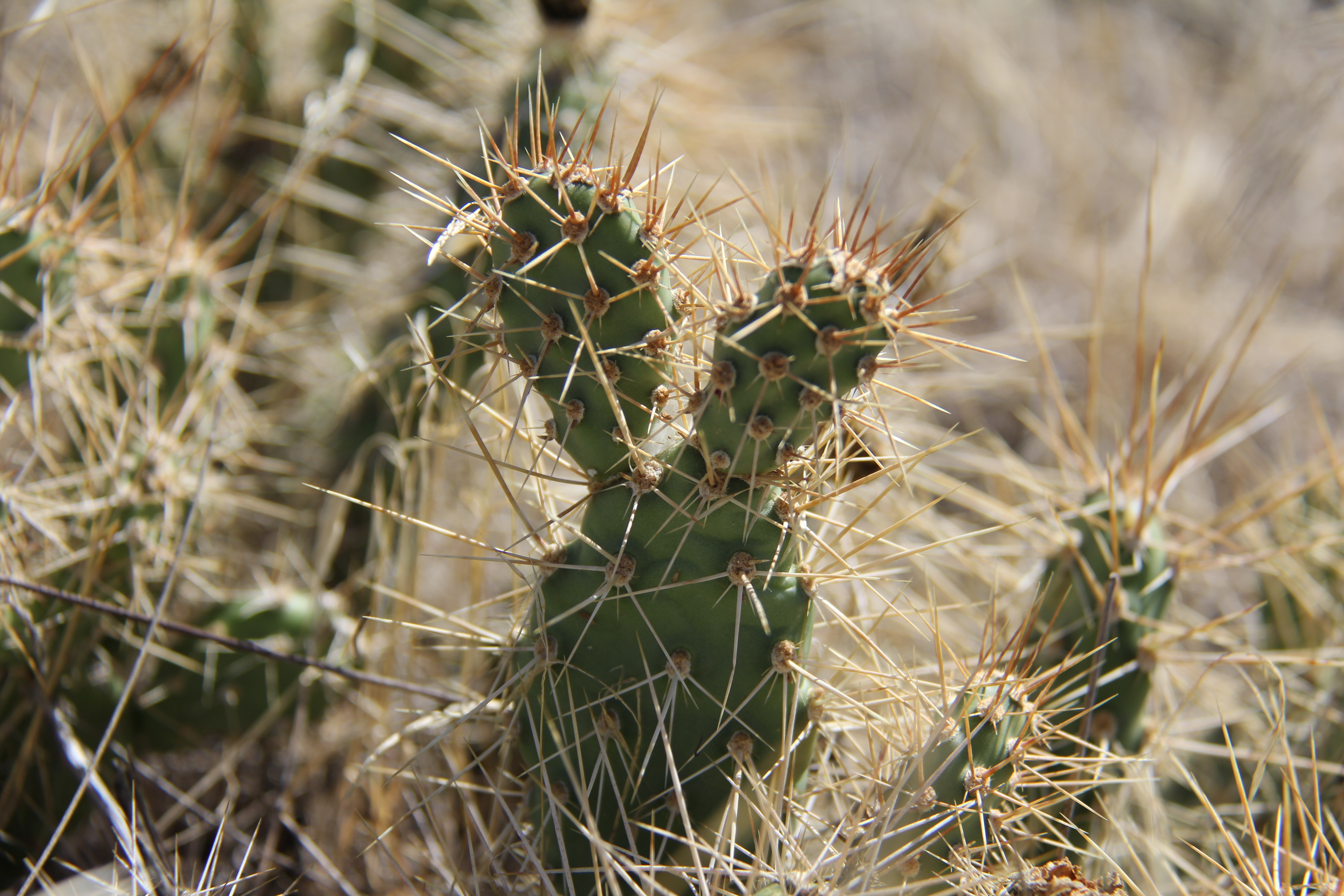
Cactus

For flora, general adaptations including transforming leaves into spines to protect themselves. With the reduction in leaf area, the stem develops as a major photosynthetic structure, which is also responsible for storing water. A common example is the cactus, which has a specific means of storing and conserving water, along with few or no leaves to minimize transpiration.

In addition to the protection provided by spines, chemical defences are also very common. Desert plants grow slowly as less photosynthesis takes place, allowing them to invest more in defence.

Another adaptation is the development of extremely long roots that allow the flora to acquire moisture at the water table. Furthermore, some desert plants exhibit behavioural adaptation; for instance, some flora live for only one season or one year, and desert perennials can survive by staying dormant during extremely dry periods; when the environment receives more moisture, they become active again.

For fauna, the easiest way is to stay away from the surface of the tropical deserts as much as possible to avoid the heat and aridity. As a result of the scarcity of water, most animals in these regions get their water from eating succulent plants and seeds, or from the tissues and blood of their prey. They also have specific ways to store water and prevent water from leaving their bodies. Some animals live in burrows under the ground which are not too hot and relatively humid; they stay in their burrows during the heat of the day, and only come out to seek food at night. Examples of these animals include kangaroo rats and lizards. Other animals, such as wolf spiders and scorpions, have a thick outer covering that minimizes moisture loss. Animals in tropical deserts have also been found to concentrate their urine in their kidneys to excrete less water.

=== Flora ===
Representative desert plants include the barrel cactus, brittlebush, and chain fruit cholla, Additionally, it is also common to see crimson hedgehog, cactus, common saltbush and desert ironwood, fairy duster, Joshua tree. In some deserts Mojave aster, ocotillo, organ pipe cactus and pancake prickly pear cactus can be found. Furthermore, paloverde, saguaro cactus, soaptree yucca, cholla guera, triangle-leaf bursage, tumbleweed and velvet mesquite can also be found in these regions.

=== Fauna ===
Representative fauna in tropical deserts include the armadillo lizard, banded Gila monster, bobcat, cactus wren and cactus ferruginous pygmy owl. Moreover, some other animals in deserts including coyote, desert bighorn sheep, desert kangaroo rat, desert tortoise, javelina and Mojave rattlesnake, cougar. Overall, different tropical deserts have different species, for example, Sonoran Desert toad, Sonoran pronghorn antelope are typical animals in Sonoran Desert.

== Natural resources ==
Rich and sometimes unique mineral resources are located in tropical deserts. Representative minerals include borax, sodium nitrate, sodium, iodine, calcium, bromine, and strontium compounds. These minerals are created when the water in desert lakes evaporates.

=== Borax ===
Borax is a natural cleaner and freshener, also known as a detergent booster. Boric acid is derived from borax and can be used to manufacture agricultural chemicals such as herbicide and insecticide, It is also used widely in fire retardants, glass, ceramics, water softeners, pharmaceuticals, paint, enamel, cosmetics and coated paper. Billions of dollars of borax has been mined in the northern Mojave Desert since 1881.

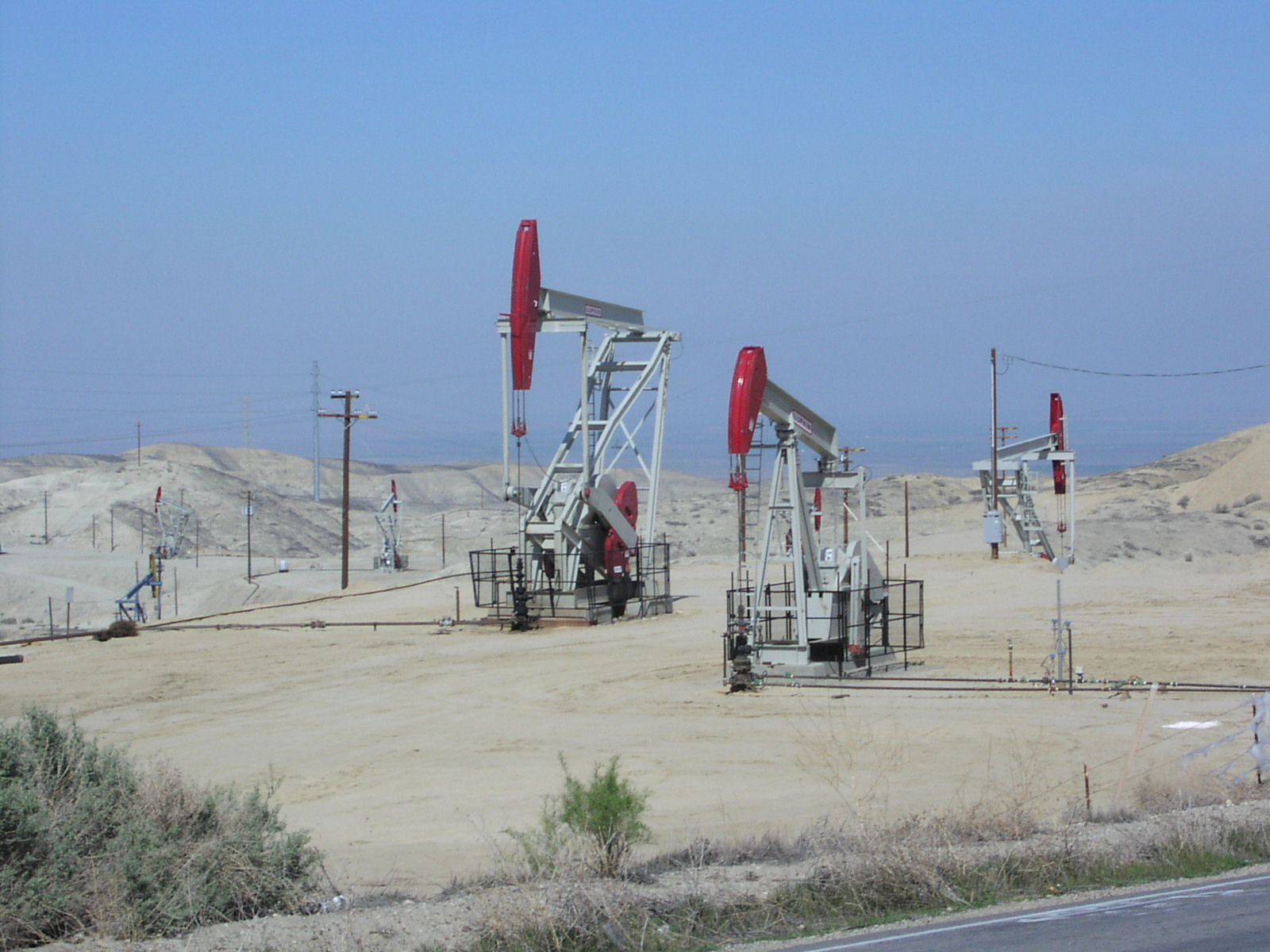
Oil Field

Borax is also a key ingredient for slime-making, the trend that was popular during the 2016-2017 period.

=== Sodium nitrate ===
Sodium nitrate forms through the evaporation of water in desert areas. The richest cache of sodium nitrate is located in South America; approximately 3 million metric tons were mined during World War I. It was the earliest food preservative, and is still used today to cure fish and meat to produce bacon, ham, sausage and deli meats. It is also used in the manufacturing of pharmaceuticals, fertilizers, dyes, explosives flares and enamels.

=== Fossil fuels ===
Natural gas and oil are complex hydrocarbons that formed millions of years ago from the decomposition of animals and plants. They are the world's primary energy source and exist in viscous, solid, liquid or gaseous forms. The five largest oil fields are in Saudi Arabia, Iraq and Kuwait. The largest petroleum-producing region in the world is the Arabian Desert

=== Metallic minerals ===
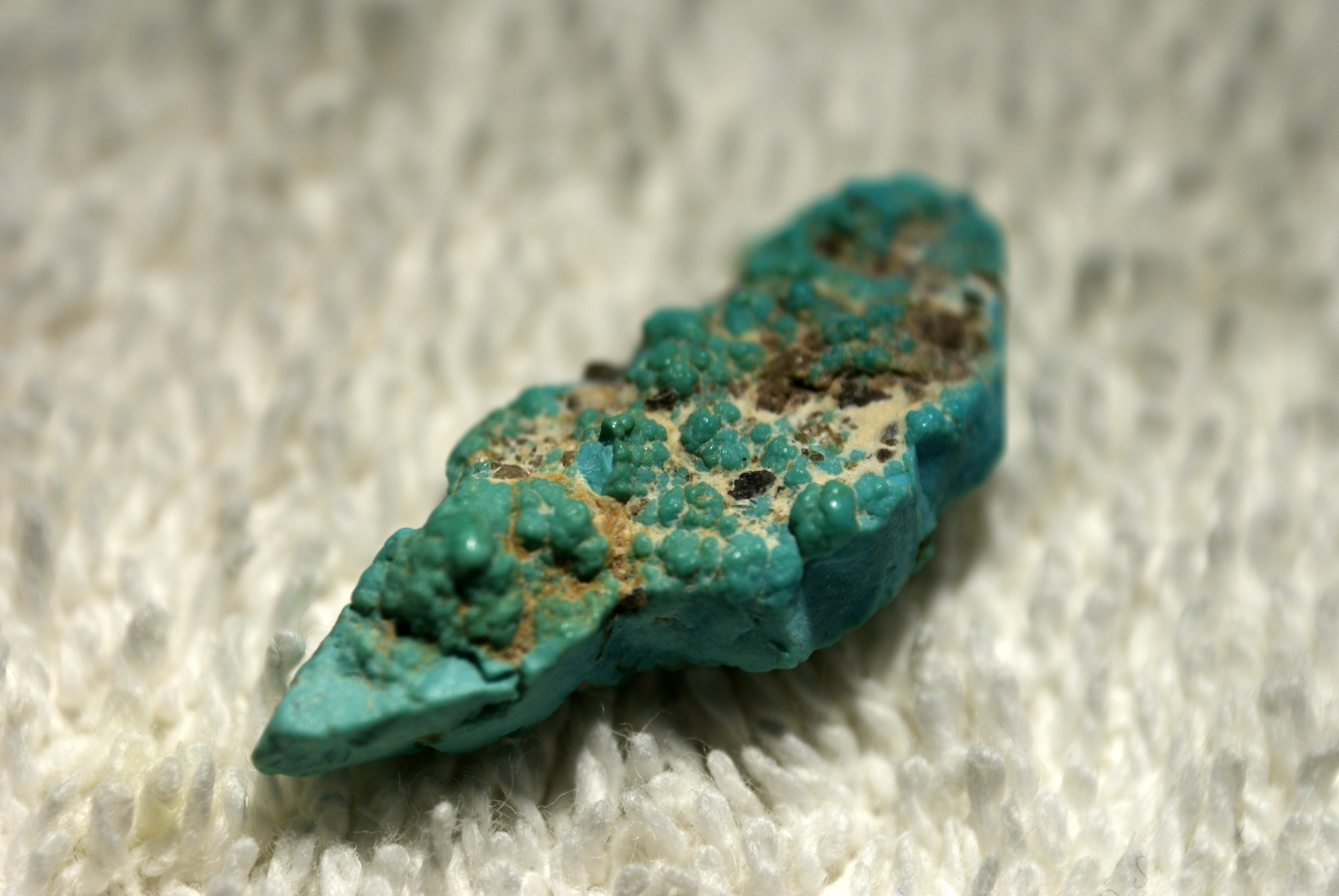
Turquoise

Most major kinds of mineral deposits formed by groundwater are located in the deserts. For example, some valuable metallic minerals, such as gold, silver, iron, zinc, and uranium, are found in Western Desert in Australia. This is due to special geological processes, and climate factors in the desert can preserve and enhance mineral deposits.

=== Gemstones ===
Tropical deserts have various precious and semi-precious gemstones. Some common semi-precious gemstones including chalcedony, opal, quartz, turquoise, jade, amethyst, petrified wood, and topaz. Precious gemstones such as diamonds are used in jewellery and decoration. Although some gemstones can also be found in temperate zones throughout the world, turquoise can only be found in tropical deserts. Turquoise is a valuable and popular opaque gemstone, with a blue-green or sky-blue colour and veins.

== See also ==
- Tropics
- Hot desert climate
