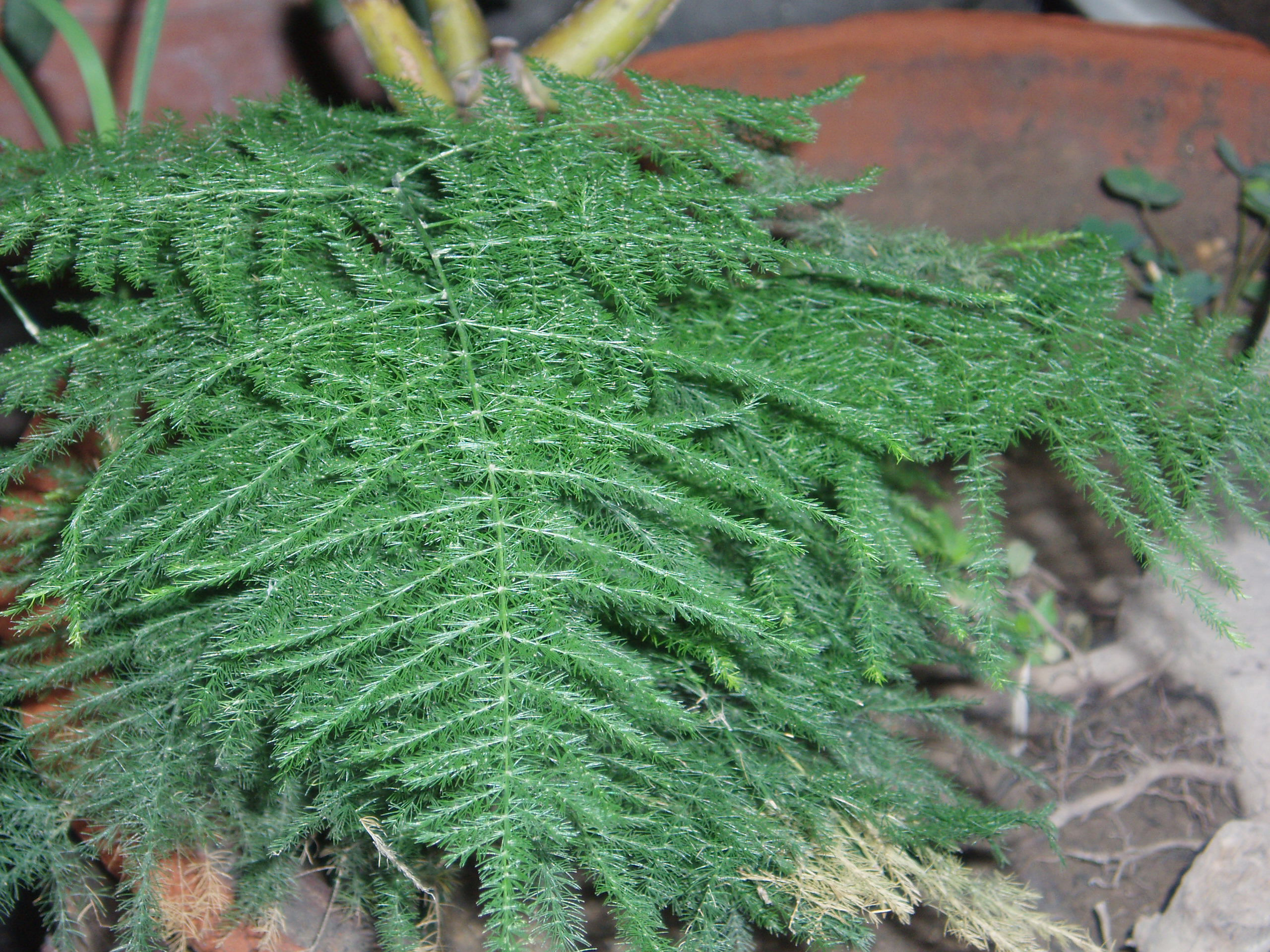
- Asparagus setaceus

Scientific classification
- Kingdom: Plantae
- Clade: Tracheophytes
- Clade: Angiosperms
- Clade: Monocots
- Order: Asparagales
- Family: Asparagaceae
- Subfamily: Asparagoideae; Burmeist.

Genera
- Asparagus L.; Hemiphylacus S.Watson

= Asparagoideae =

Subfamily of plants

Asparagoideae is a subfamily of monocot flowering plants in the family Asparagaceae, order Asparagales, according to the APG III system of 2009. The subfamily name is derived from the generic name of the type genus, Asparagus. The group has previously been treated as a separate family Asparagaceae sensu stricto.

The subfamily contains only two genera, Asparagus with some 160–290 species, and Hemiphylacus with five species. (Hemiphylacus used to be placed in the Asphodeloideae/Asphodelaceae.) They are distributed in Europe, Africa and Asia, with a few species in Australasia and Mexico. Asparagus has small paper-like (scarious) leaves at the base of leaf-like branches which act as the photosynthetic organs (phylloclades).
