= List of invasive plant species in New South Wales =

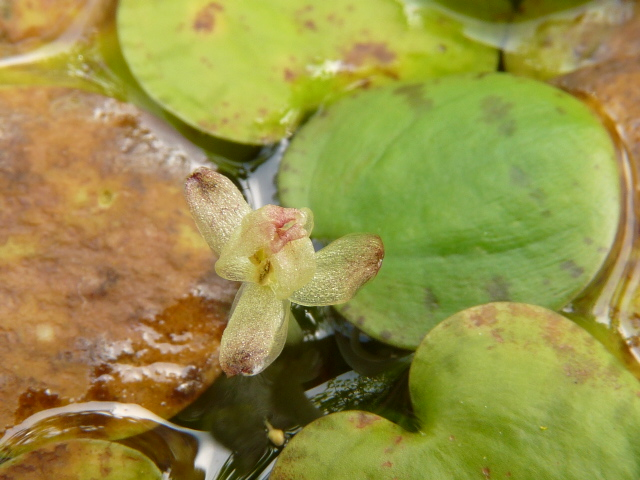
Limnobium laevigatum (frogbit) is declared ‘prohibited matter’ under the Biosecurity Act 2015 for its invasive and obstructive nature, therefore it is illegal to buy or sell this plant in NSW.

Numerous plants have been introduced to the state of New South Wales, Australia during the past two centuries, and many of them have become invasive species or noxious weeds which by definition compete with native plants and suppress the growth of indigenous populations. New South Wales has over 340 weeds, though only one-third are considered noxious, which were purposefully introduced as garden and farmland plants, and thus had escaped. They generally consist of agricultural, scrub, aquatic, roadside and allergenic weeds.

Weeds threaten more than 40% of New South Wales threatened species (which are predominantly plants) and around 90% of endangered ecological communities. An excess of $50 million of public money (half which come from state government) is currently being spent on weed control. Despite the efforts, the control is not keeping up with their invasiveness, and the NSW Government has granted that it is unlikely to surpass its 2015 goal of ‘a reduction in the impact of invasive species’.

Weeds are threat to the state's natural environment and would jeopardise many native plants and animals in New South Wales. They would also effect the price of food, human condition (allergies and asthma), recreational activities and the economy of New South Wales. The harmful impact of weeds is increasing fast as more species are introduced and dispersed into new areas. General, state or regional biosecurity duties under the Biosecurity Act 2015 are presented for each weed.

== Weed classification ==
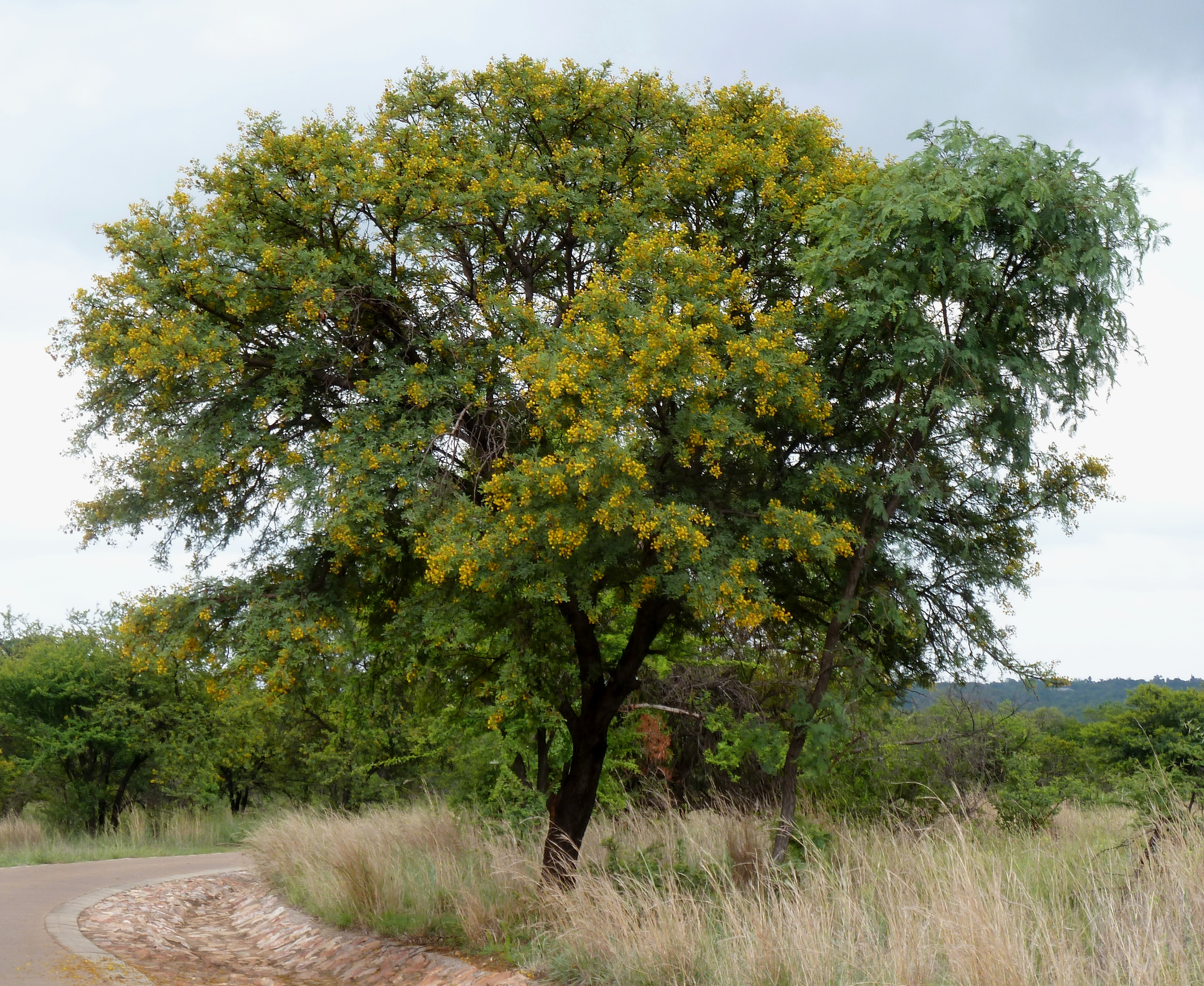
A Class 1 weed, it is a criminal offense to import or plant Vachellia karroo.

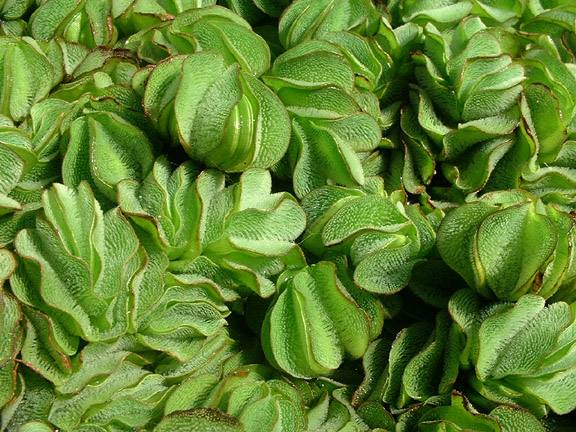
A Class 2 weed, Salvinia molesta is regionally prohibited and should be eradicated from the land.

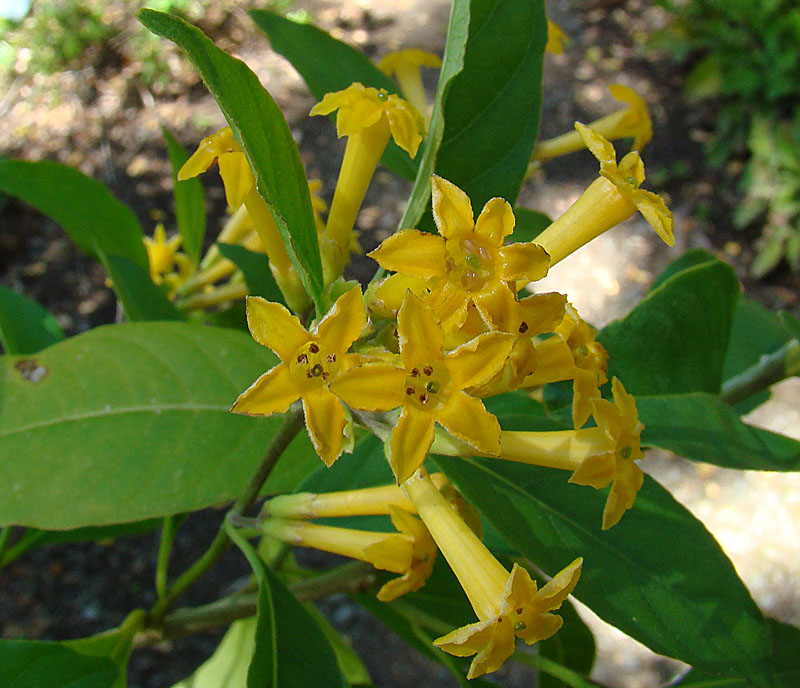
A Class 3 weed, land managers should minimise the risk of introducing or spreading Cestrum parqui.

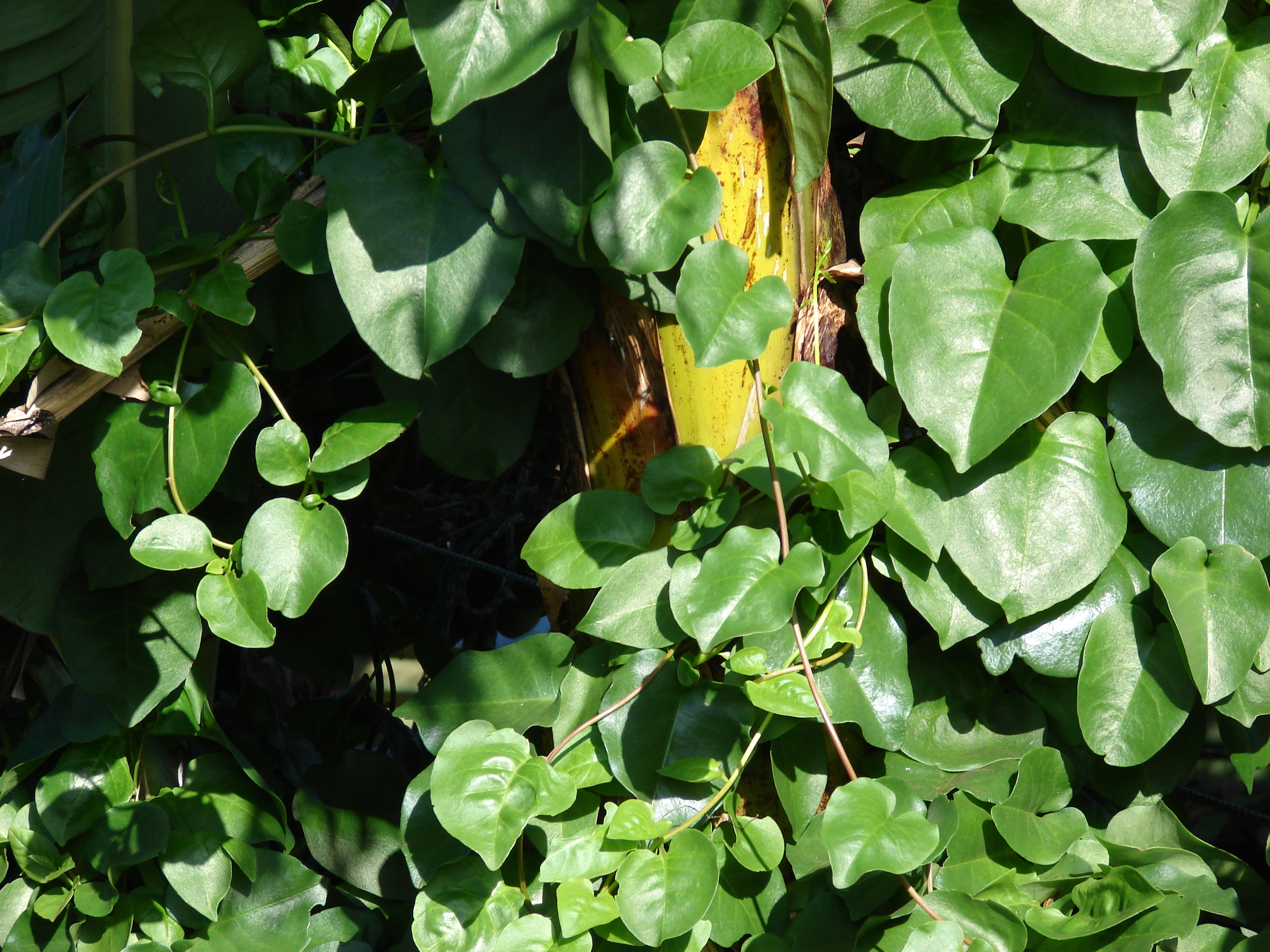
A Class 4 weed, Anredera cordifolia must not be sold or imported into the state.

This is the Noxious Weeds Act 1993:

- Class 1: State prohibited weeds (Risk Rating 1 - Very High Risk) – Plants that pose a potentially serious threat to primary production or the environment and are not present in the State, or are present only to a limited extent. They must be eradicated from the land and the land must be kept free of the plant. In other words, these plants have not invaded NSW yet, but should be prevented from introduction and establishment in the state. The entire state of NSW command the destruction of noxious weeds that fall under this class and keeping the entire state free of such plant. The existence of the plant must be notified to the local control authority.
- Class 2: Regionally prohibited weeds (Risk Rating 2 - High Risk) – Plants that pose a potentially serious threat to primary production or the environment of a region to which the order applies and are not present in the region, or are present only to a limited extent. They must be eradicated from the land and the land must be kept free of the plant. These plants have also not invaded NSW yet, but should be prevented from introduction and establishment only in certain LGAs.
- Class 3: Regionally controlled weeds (Risk Rating 3 - Medium Risk) – Plants that pose a potentially serious threat to primary production or the environment of an area to which the order applies, are not widely distributed in the area, and are likely to spread within the area or to another area. They must be fully and continuously suppressed and destroyed. Invasive plants here have established to an extent, but must be reduced in the area and in their impact in parts of the state. The region or LGA area should ceaselessly subdue and destroy class 3 weeds to decrease the negative impacts of their infestation. Some are also prohibited from sale or distribution.
- Class 4: Locally controlled weeds (Risk Rating 4 - Marginal Risk) – Plants that pose a potentially serious threat to primary production, the environment or human health, are widely distributed in an area to which the order applies and are likely to spread in the area or to another area. The growth of the plant must be managed in a way that reduces its numbers, spread and incidence, and continually stops reproducing. The plant must not be sold, propagated or knowingly distributed. Due to their establishment, the LGAs should control the spread of class 4 noxious weeds to lessen their numbers, dispersal, and to reduce their growth endlessly. The local council should also decrease their negative impacts on agriculture, community, and environment. The plant may not be sold, propagated or intentionally distributed in some LGAs.
- Class 5: Restricted plants (Risk Rating 5 - Low Risk) – Plants that are likely, by their sale or the sale of their seeds or movement within the state or an area of the state, to spread in the state or outside the state. Owners or occupiers of land must notify their local control authorities if they're aware of the spread of these weeds on land. These plants should be prevented from introduction and establishment within the state or from New South Wales to another state. In NSW, restrictions apply to weeds that have not been established yet or are scarcely present. The state also forbids merchandising weeds that were originally garden or aquarium plants which have the power to become noxious weeds.

=== Priority weeds ===
The Biosecurity Act 2015 restricts those that trade or transport plants (called 'priority weeds') that damage the state's environment, economy and community. The restrictions apply to all parts of the plant, such as cuttings, cultivars and hybrids.

'State priority weeds' are banned from being sold in NSW. 'Regional priority weeds' should not be sold or transported in certain regions of NSW. Those that buy or sell them are committing an offence, where they can be issued with hefty penalties. These legal rules apply:

- "Prohibited Matter – A person who deals with prohibited matter or a carrier of prohibited matter is guilty of an offence. The definition of 'dealing' is broad and includes having, buying, selling, moving, growing and disposal."
- "Control Order – Requires all parts of the plant to be destroyed until eradicated."
- "Mandatory Measure (Prohibition on Dealings) – Must not be imported into the State or sold."

== Lists ==
=== Noxious weeds ===
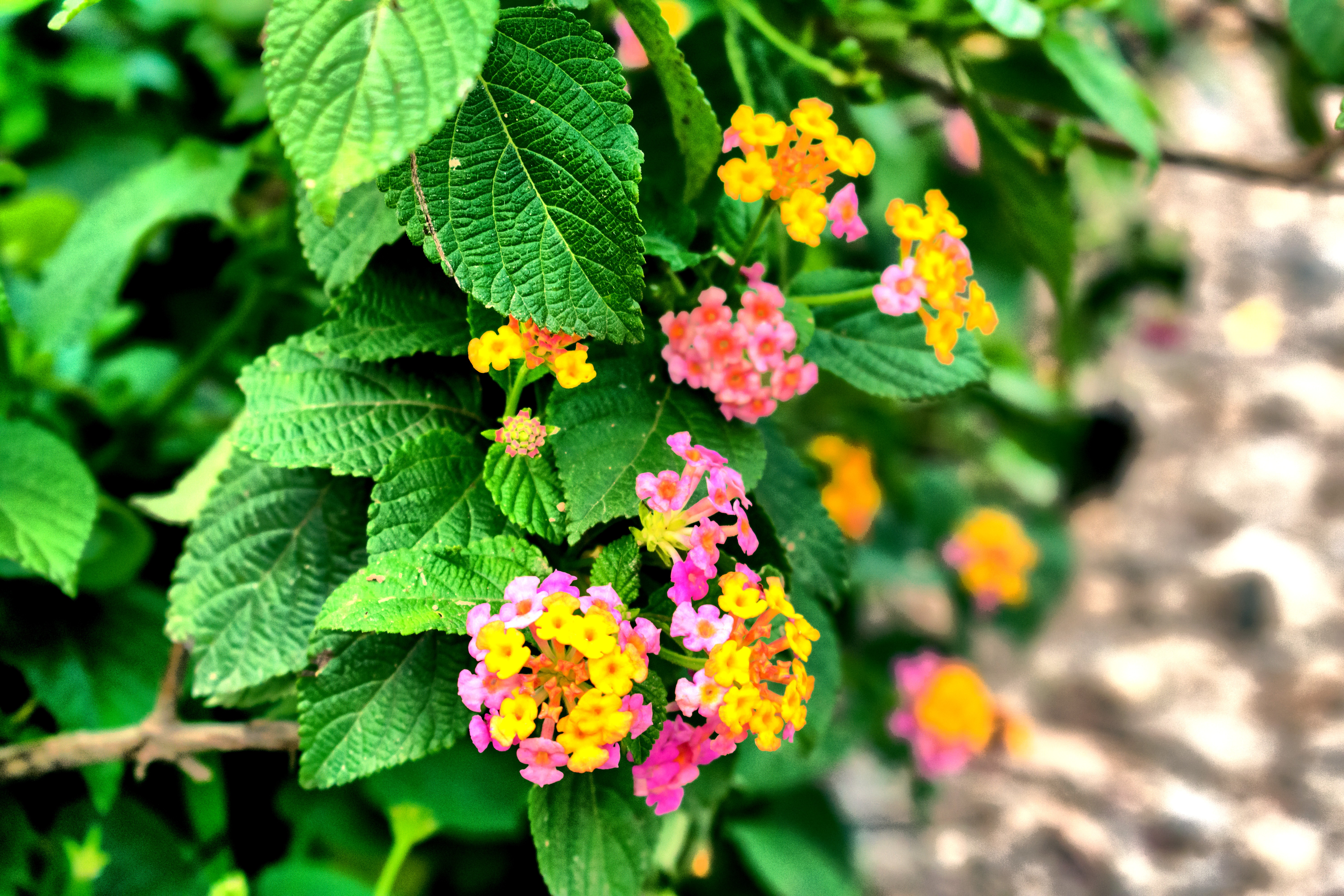
A Class 3, 4 and/or 5 weed (depending on the region), Lantana camara is a noxious weed that must not be sold or imported into the state.

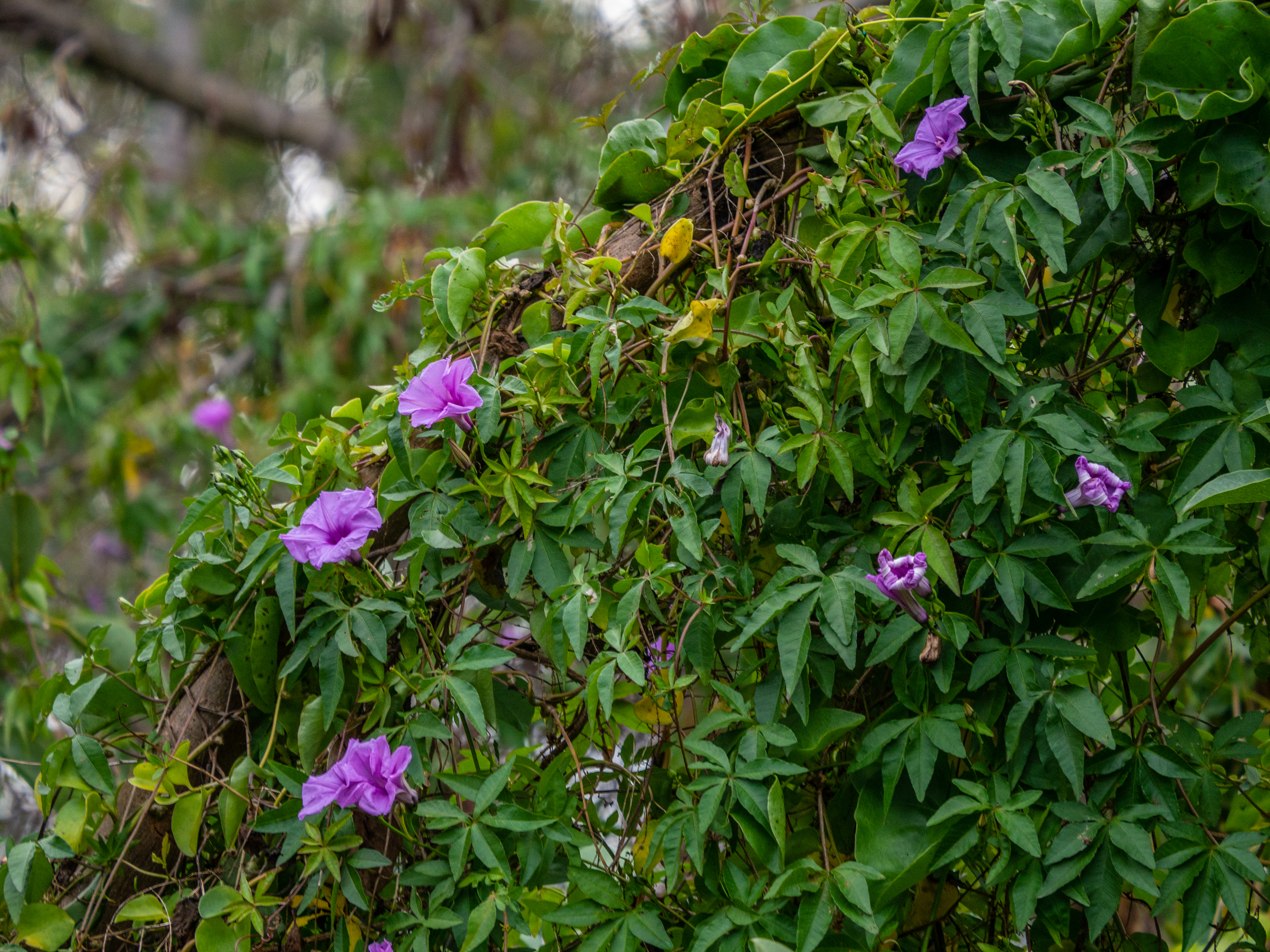
Ipomoea cairica (Cairo morning glory) is a locally controlled weed (Class 4) and may not be sold or propagated in most areas of Sydney.

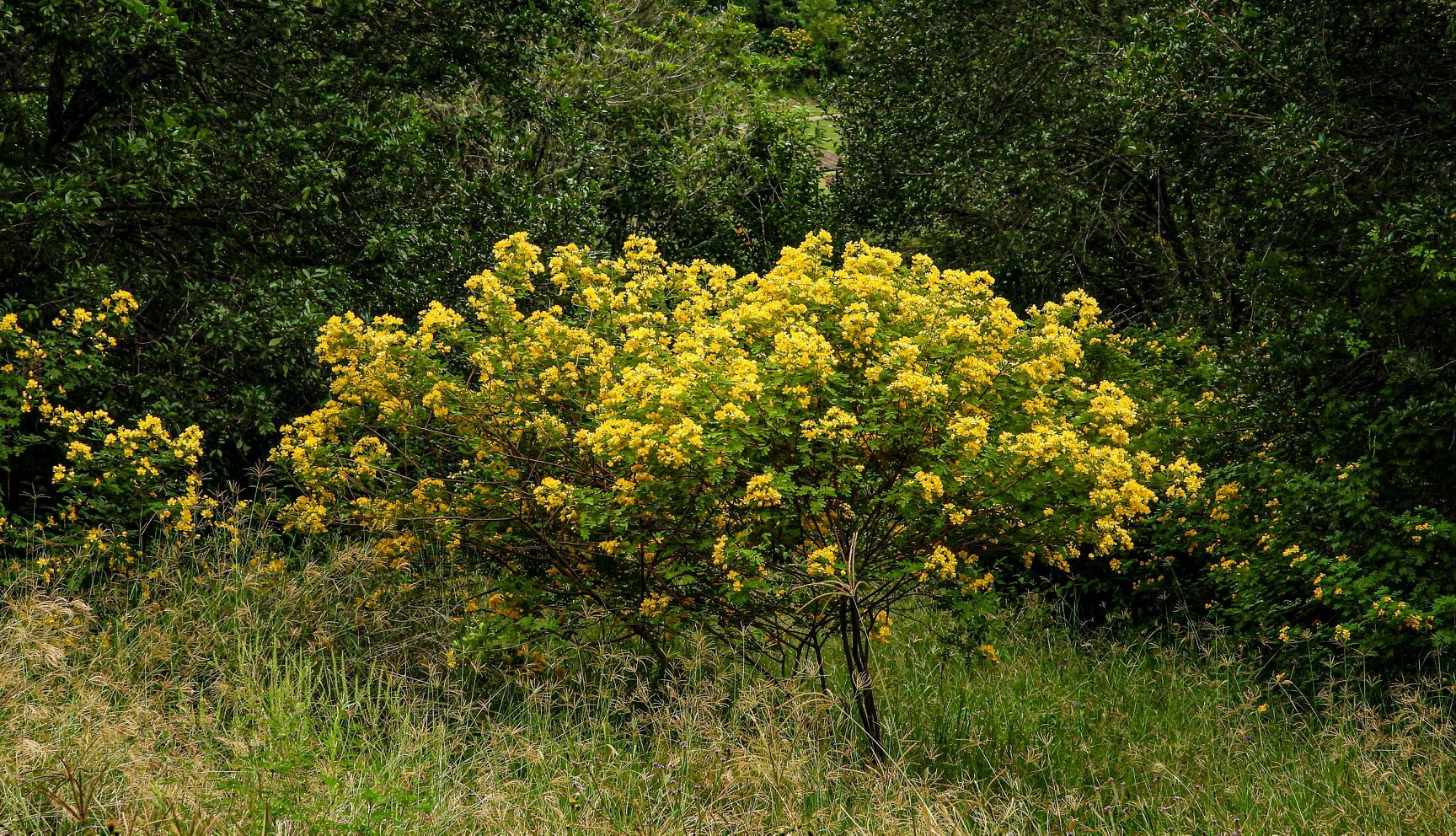
Initially an ornamental plant, Senna pendula has become a major pest in eastern Australia and is regarded a Class 4 weed.

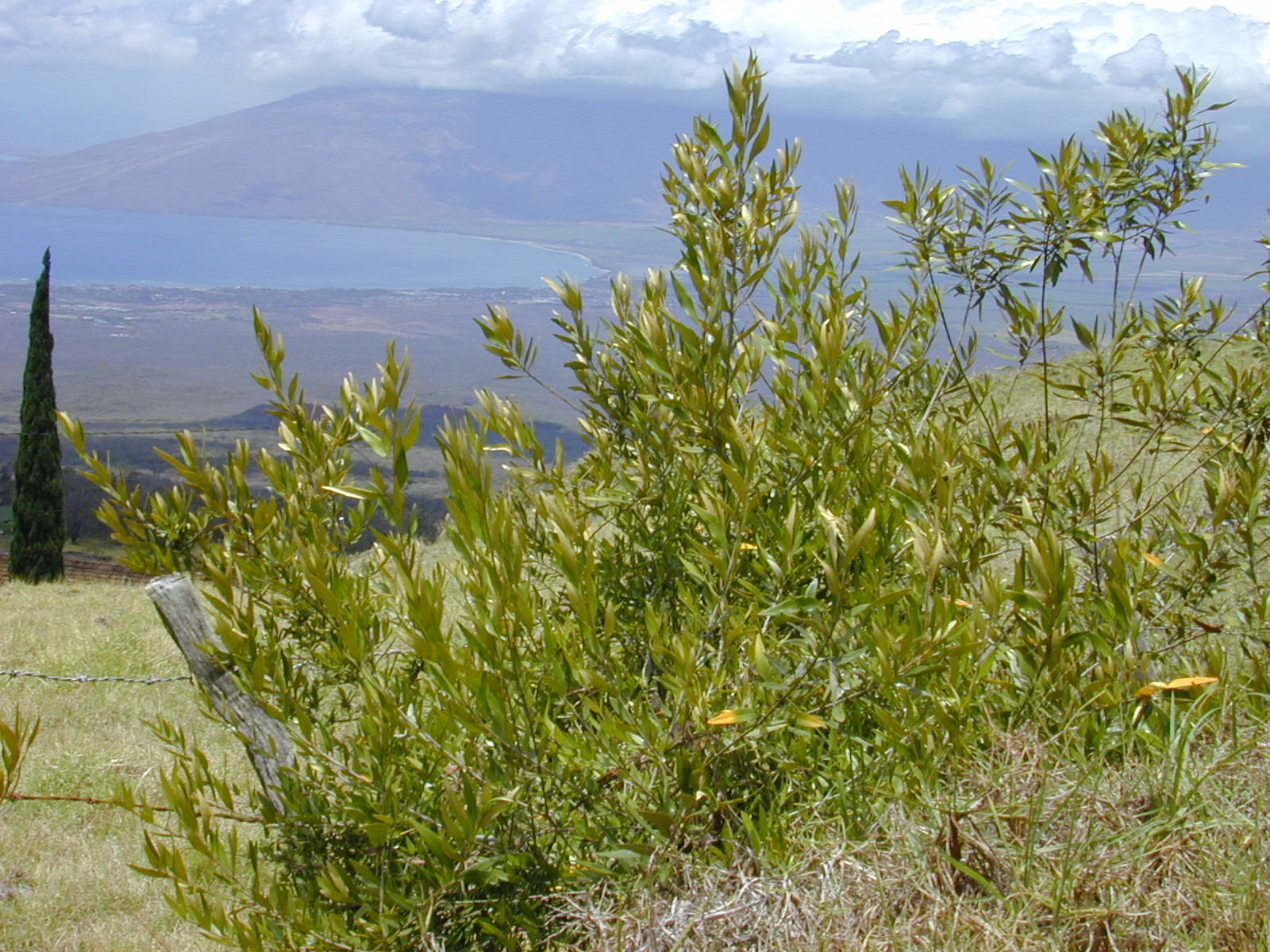
A Class 4 weed, Olea europaea subsp. cuspidata (African olive) is not to be traded, carried, grown or released into the environment.

Plants listed below are noxious weeds that should not to be sold in parts of New South Wales due to their invasive nature (most listed here are a 'Weed of National Significance') as they pose a threat to native fauna and flora, and are in the class 3 or 4 categories (a few are prohibited for purchase or propagation in some local government areas). Some of which are widespread weeds, found particularly in disturbed areas, parks and/or house gardens. Some are no longer commonly grown, while others are still cultivated.

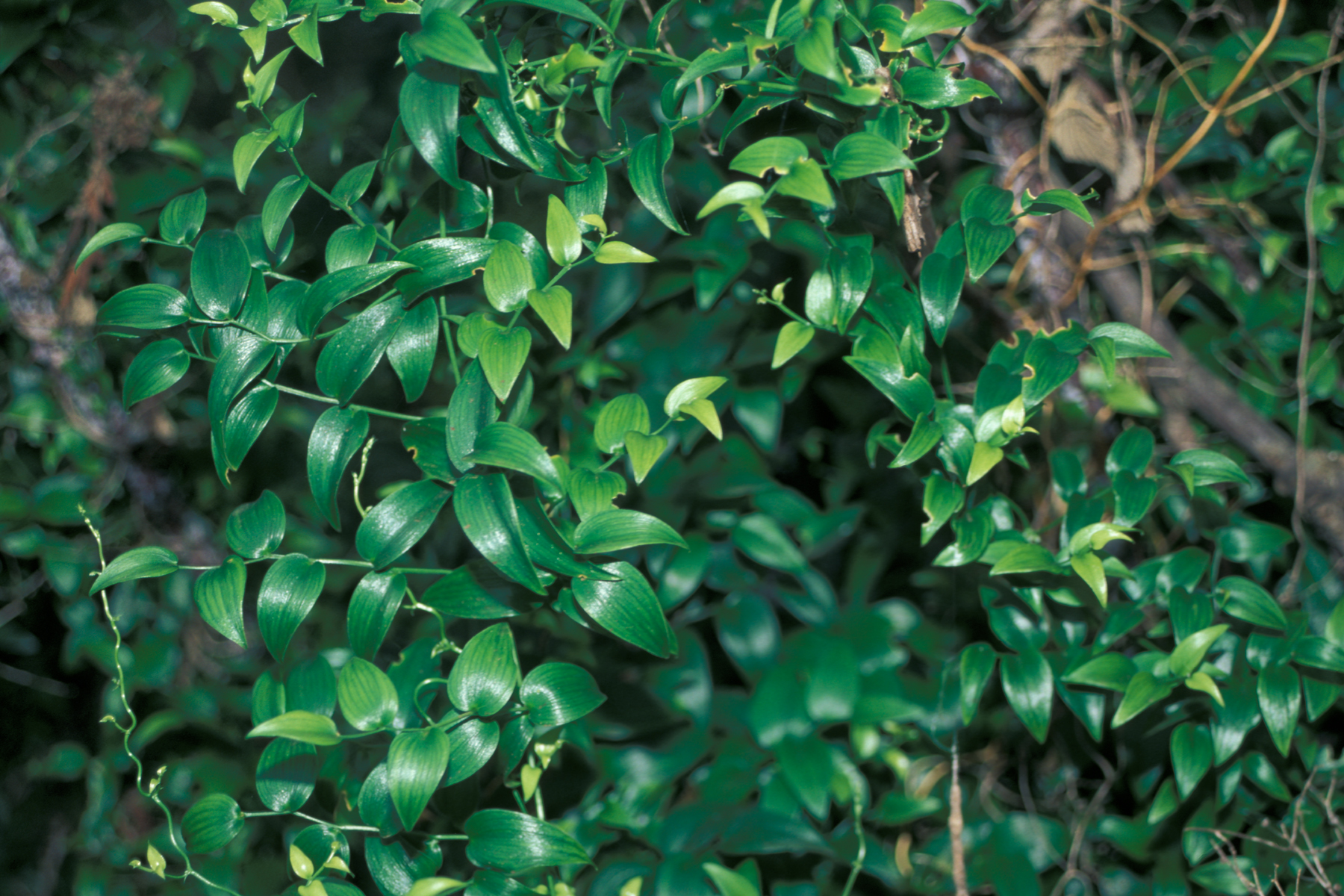
A Class 5 weed, Asparagus asparagoides (bridal creeper) is a restricted weed that may not be sold, bought or knowingly distributed throughout the state.

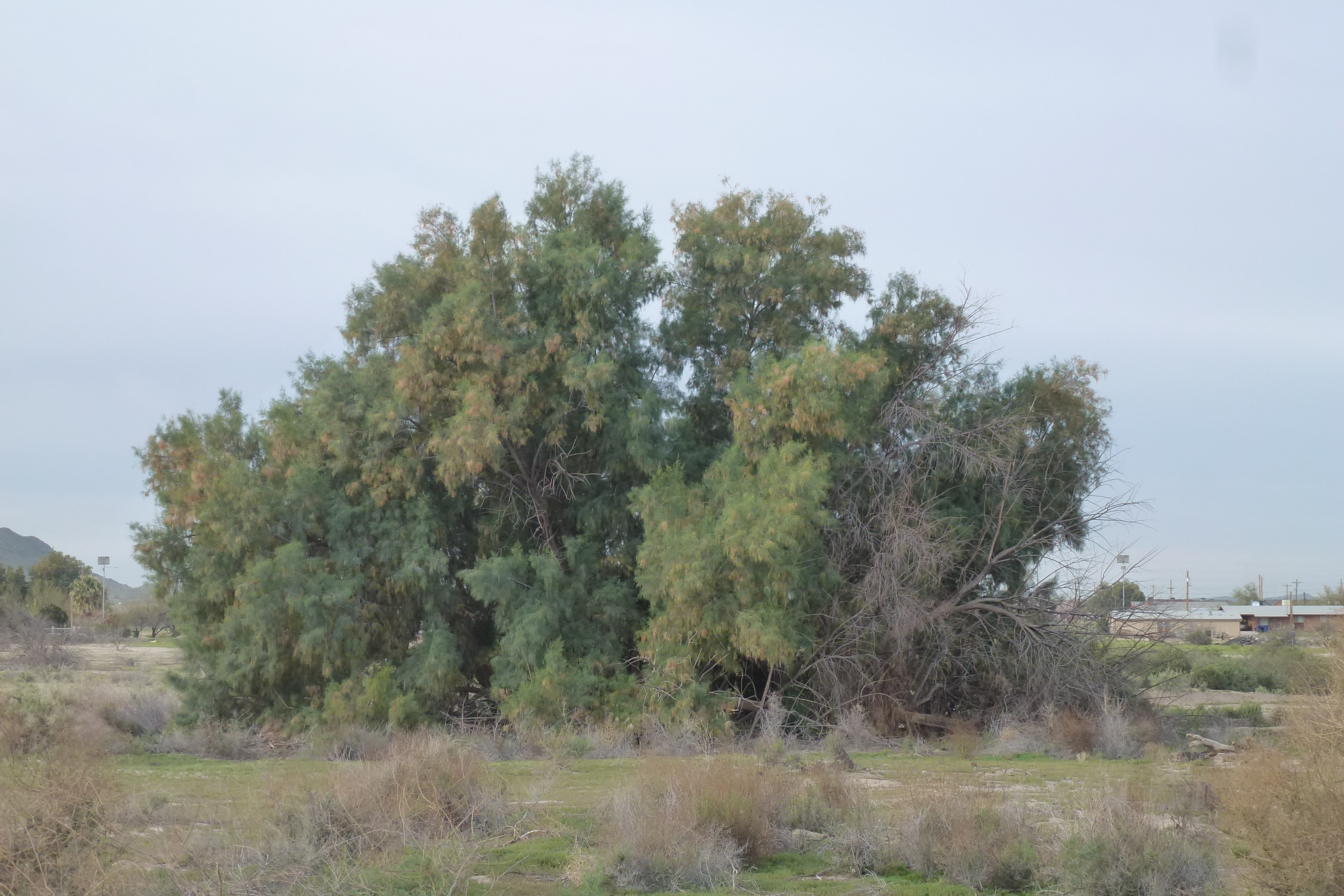
A Class 5 weed, Tamarix aphylla is a restricted weed that should not be sold or brought into the state.

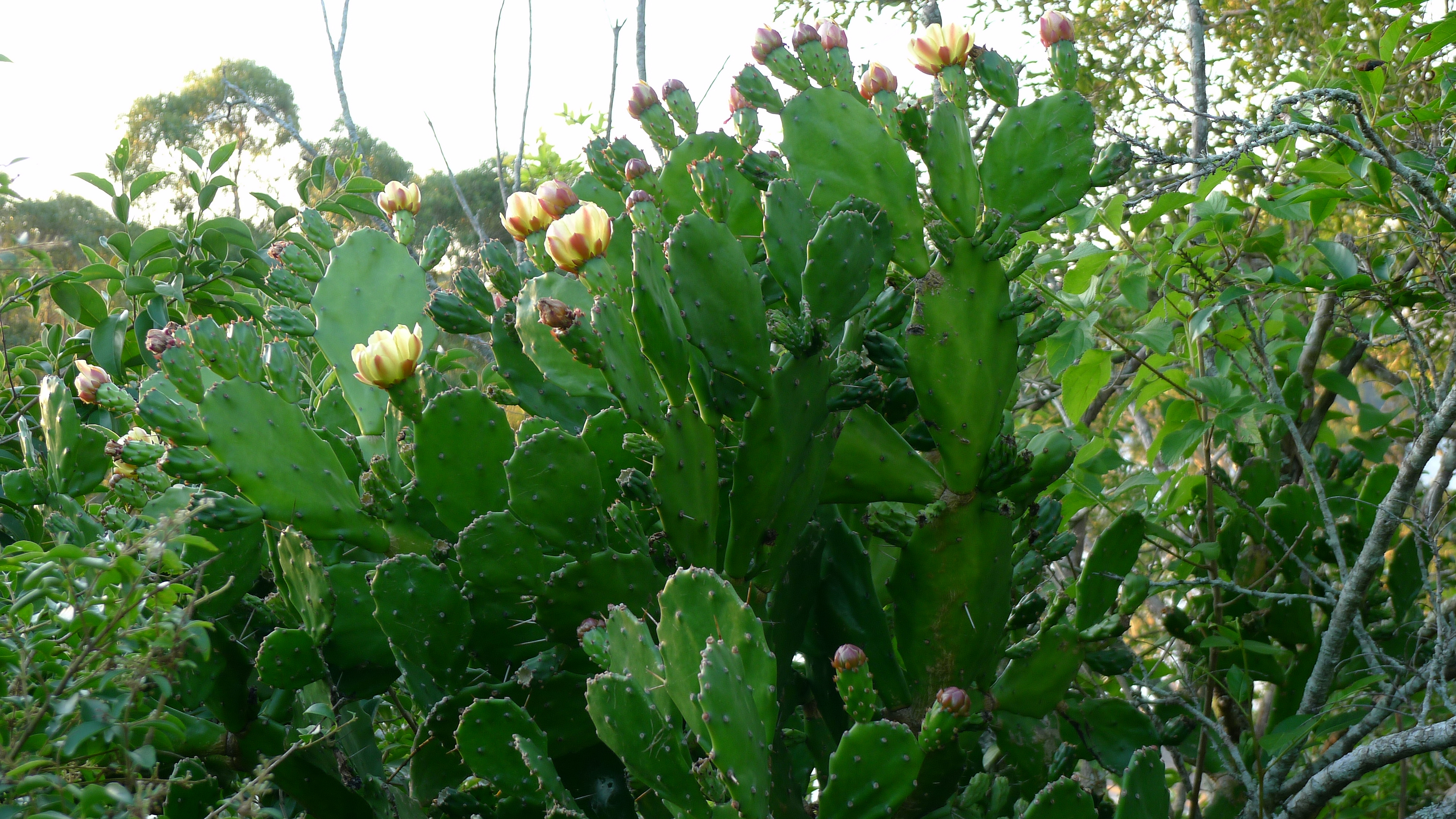
A Class 4 weed, Opuntia monacantha or the common prickly pear has a prohibition on dealings.

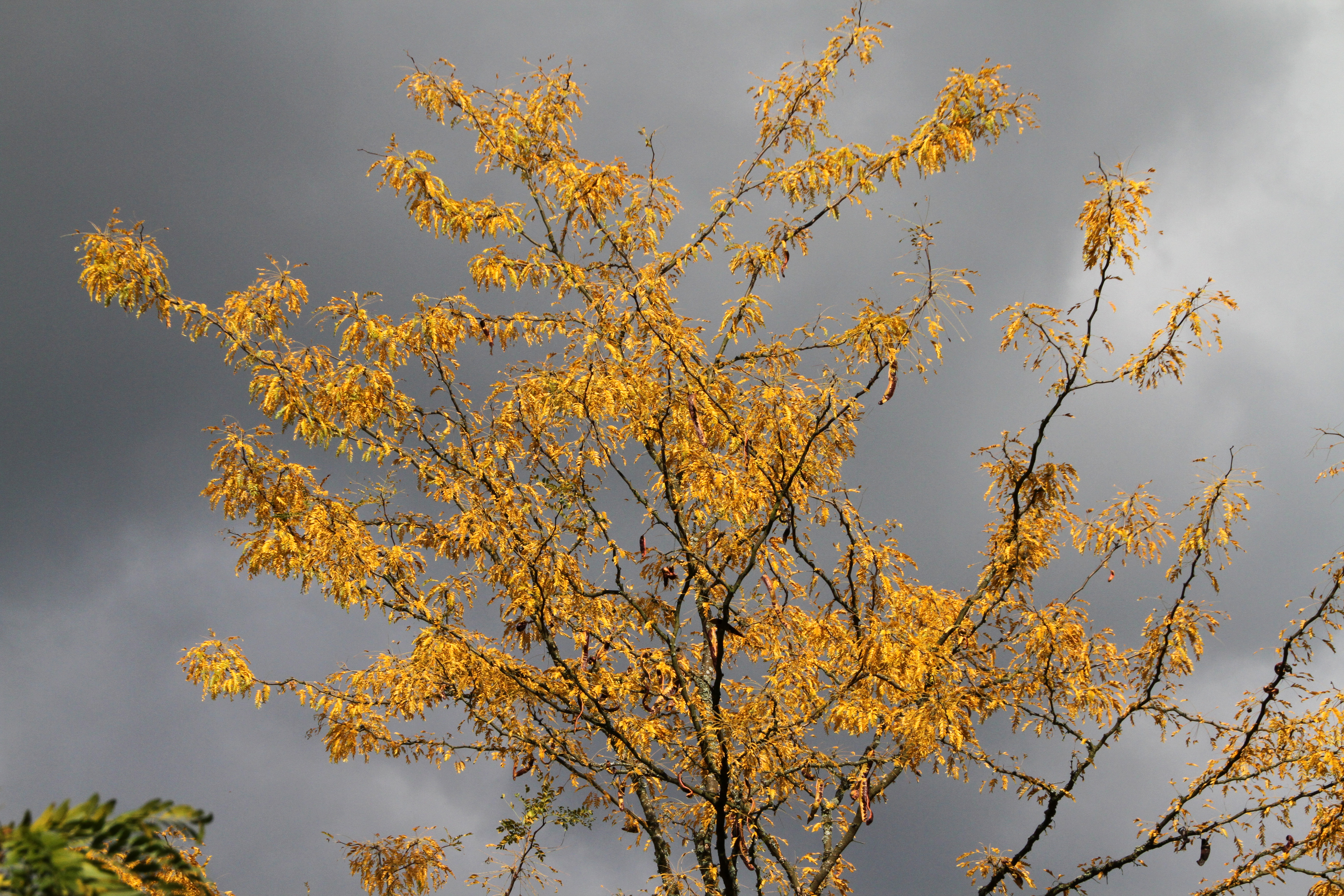
A Class 3 weed, Honey locusts should be fully and continuously suppressed and destroyed in parts of the North Coast.

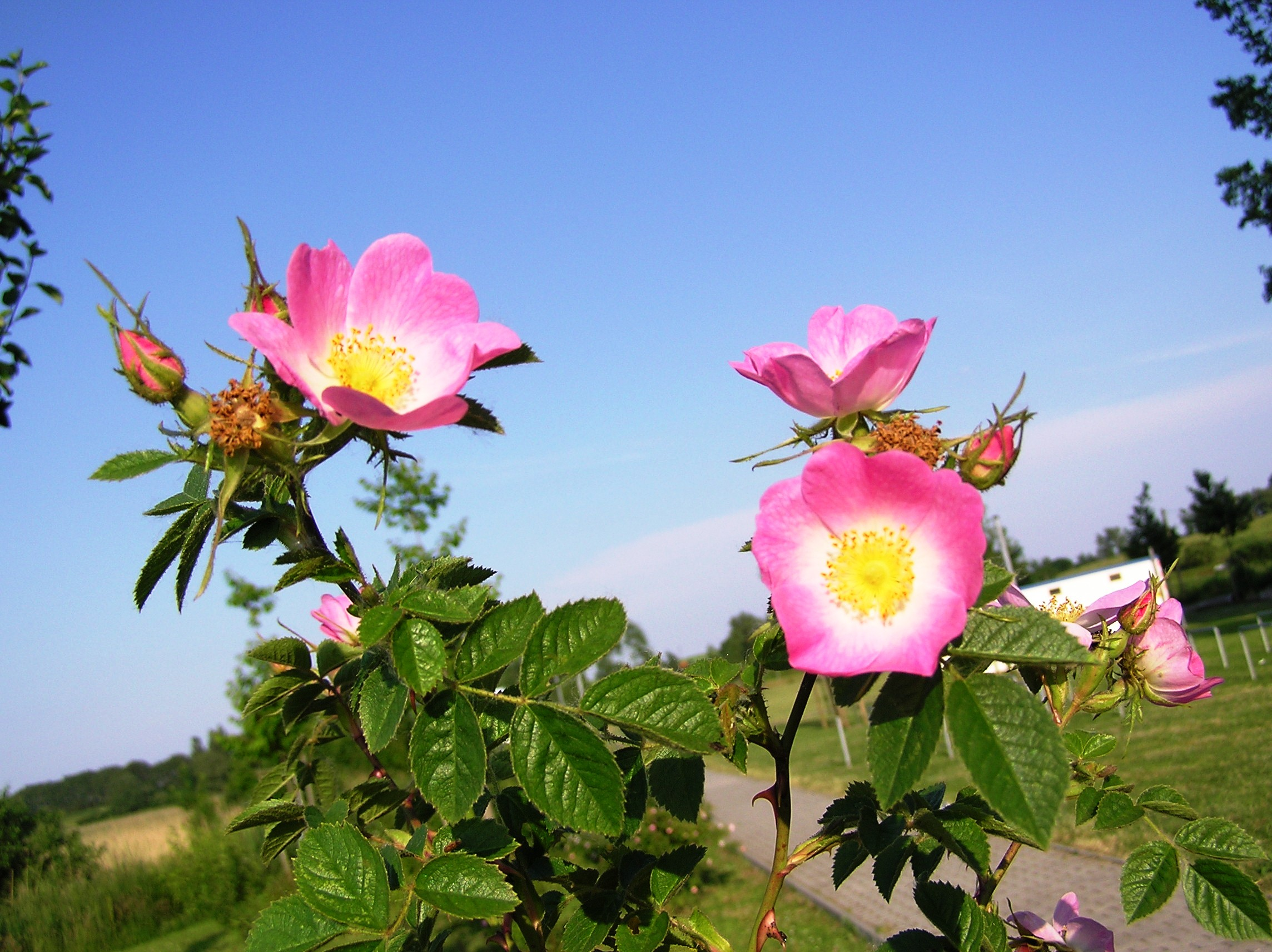
Although an ornamental plant, Rosa rubiginosa is not to be sold or propagated in numerous local authority areas, making it a Class 4 weed.

- Opuntia leucotricha (Aaron's beard cactus)
- Lycium ferocissimum (African boxthorn)
- **Olea europaea subsp. cuspidata** (African olive)
- Echinochloa polystachya (Aleman grass)
- Alternanthera philoxeroides (Alligator weed)
- Ambrosia artemisiifolia (Annual ragweed)
- Sagittaria calycina (Arrowhead)
- Asparagus virgatus (Asparagus fern)
- Parietaria judaica (asthma weed)
- Tamarix aphylla (Athel pine)
- **Cardiospermum grandiflorum** (balloon vine creeper)
- Barleria prionitis (Barleria)
- Jatropha gossypiifolia (Bellyache bush)
- Rubus fruticosus (Blackberry)
- Robinia pseudoacacia (Black locust)
- Salix nigra (Black willow)
- Heliotropium amplexicaule (Blue heliotrope)
- Cynoglossum creticum (Blue hound's tongue)
- Chrysanthemoides monilifera (Boneseed)
- Cylindropuntia fulgida (Boxing glove cactus)
- **Asparagus asparagoides** (Bridal creeper)
- Schinus terebinthifolius (Broad-leaf pepper tree)
- Agrostis capillaris (Brown-top bent)
- Ambrosia confertiflora (Burr ragweed)
- Cabomba caroliniana (Cabomba)
- **Ipomoea cairica** (Cairo morning glory)
- Nassella hyalina (Camel thorn)
- Cinnamomum camphora (camphor laurel)
- Austrocylindropuntia cylindrica (Cane cactus)
- Nassella hyalina (Cane needle grass)
- Genista monspessulana (Cape broom)
- Moraea flaccida (Cape tulip)
- Moraea miniata (Cape tulip - two-leaf)
- Orbea variegata (Carrion flower)
- **Ricinus communis** (castor oil plant)
- **Dolichandra unguis-cati** (cats claw creeper)
- Jatropha gossypifolia (Cotton-leaved physic-nut)
- Cecropia spp. (Cecropia)
- **Kalanchoe delagoensis** (chandelier plant)
- Celtis sinensis (Chinese celtis)
- Persicaria chinensis (Chinese knotweed)
- **Ligustrum lucidum** (Chinese privet)
- Triadica sebifera (Chinese tallow tree)
- Asystasia gangetica (Chinese violet)
- Asparagus plumosus (Climbing asparagus fern)
- Oenothera curtiflora (Clockweed)
- **Lantana camara** (common lantana)
- **Opuntia monacantha** (common prickly pear)
- Erythrina crista-galli (Cockspur coral tree)
- Hyparrhenia hirta (Coolatai grass)
- Rhaponticum repens (Creeping knapweed)
- Oxalis corniculata (creeping woodsorrel)
- **Araujia sericifera** (cruel vine)
- Ageratina adenophora (crofton Weed)
- Hygrophila polysperma (East Indian hygrophila)
- **Senna pendula** (Easter cassia)
- Amelichloa caudata (Espartillo - broad kernel)
- Amelichloa brachychaeta (Espartillo - narrow kernel)
- Austrocylindropuntia subulata (Eve's needle cactus)
- Foeniculum vulgare (fennel)
- **Senecio madagascariensis** (fireweed)
- **Asparagus aethiopicus** (foxtail fern)
- Delairea odorata (German ivy)
- Solanum chrysotrichum (Giant devil's fig)
- Sporobolus fertilis (Giant Parramatta grass)
- Sporobolus pyramidalis (Giant rat's tail grass)
- Arundo donax (Giant reed)
- Gloriosa superba (Glory lily)
- Ulex europaeus (Gorse)
- **Cestrum parqui** (green cestrum)
- Baccharis halimifolia (Groundsel bush)
- Harrisia spp. (Harrisia cactus)
- Senecio glastifolius (Holly leaved senecio)
- Gleditsia triacanthos (Honey locust)
- Equisetum spp. (Horsetails)
- Hygrophila costata (Hygrophila)
- Hymenachne amplexicaulis (Hymenachne)
- Juglans ailantifolia (Japanese walnut)
- Sorghum halepense (Johnson grass)
- Vachellia nilotica (Karroo acacia)
- Dovyalis caffra (Kei apple)
- Heteranthera reniformis (Kidney-leaf mud plantain)
- Pueraria lobata (Kudzu)
- Pereskia aculeata (Leaf cactus)
- Egeria densa (Leafy elodea)
- Leucaena leucocephala (Leucaena)
- Phyla canescens (lippia)
- Ludwigia longifolia (Long-leaf willow primrose)
- Ludwigia peruviana (Ludwigia)
- **Anredera cordifolia** (Madeira-vine)
- Berberis lomariifolia (Mahonia)
- Prosopis pallida (Mesquite)
- Ochna serrulata (Mickey Mouse plant)
- Mimosa pigra (Mimosa)
- Asparagus macowanii (Ming asparagus fern)
- Ageratina riparia (mistflower)
- Pithecoctenium crucigerum (Monkey's comb)
- Ipomoea alba (Moonflower)
- Leucanthemum vulgare (Ox-eye daisy)
- Cortaderia spp. (Pampas grass)
- Echium plantagineum (Paterson's curse)
- Parietaria judaica (pellitory of the wall)
- Physalis longifolia (Perennial ground cherry)
- Annona glabra (Pond apple)
- Physalis hederifolia (Prairie ground cherry)
- Ligustrum vulgare (Privet - European)
- **Ligustrum sinense** (Privet - narrow-leaf)
- **Ipomoea indica** (purple morning glory)
- Senecio jacobaea (Ragwort)
- Crotalaria beddomeana (Rattlepod)
- Xanthium strumarium (rough cocklebur)
- Toxicodendron succedaneum (Rhus tree)
- Salvinia molesta (Salvinia)
- Cytisus scoparius (Scotch broom)
- Euphorbia paralias (Sea spurge)
- Gymnocoronis spilanthoides (Senegal tea plant)
- Ardisia elliptica (Shoebutton ardisia)
- Limonium hyblaeum (Sicilian sea lavender)
- Asparagus falcatus (Sicklethorn)
- Sphagneticola trilobata (Singapore daisy)
- Paederia foetida (Skunk vine)
- Spartium junceum (Spanish broom)
- Erica lusitanica (Spanish heath)
- Cenchrus longispinus (Spiny burrgrass - longispinus)
- Cenchrus spinifex (Spiny burrgrass - spinifex)
- Hypericum perforatum (St. John's wort)
- Solanum sisymbriifolium (Sticky nightshade)
- Rosa rubiginosa (Sweet briar)
- Opuntia aurantiaca (Tiger pear)
- Elephantopus mollis (Tobacco weed)
- Ailanthus altissima (tree of heaven)
- Solanum viarum (Tropical soda apple)
- Acetosa sagittata (turkey rhubarb)
- Hypericum androsaemum (Tutsan)
- Opuntia tomentosa (Velvety tree pear)
- **Tradescantia fluminensis** (wandering jew)
- Rubus niveus (White blackberry)
- Pistia stratiotes (Water lettuce)
- Eichhornia crassipess (Water hyacinth)
- Nymphaea spp. (Water lilies)
- Neptunia oleracea (Water mimosa)
- Hydrocleys nymphoides (Water poppy)
- Heteranthera zosterifolia (Water star grass)
- Searsia lancea (Willow rhus)
- Tecoma stans (Yellow bells)
- Limnocharis flava (Yellow burhead)
- Cyperus esculentus (Yellow nutgrass)

_{Species in bold are common or widespread in the state.}

=== Prohibited species ===
Plants listed below are presently Prohibited Matter in the Biosecurity Act 2015. These plants are banned for importation into NSW and are not yet present in the state. Any person that deals with a Prohibited Matter plant is guilty of an offence. They are generally categorized under Class 1 (state prohibited weeds):

Common name	Scientific name
Anchored water hyacinth	Eichhornia azurea
Black knapweed	Centaurea x moncktonii
Bridal veil creeper	Asparagus declinatus
Broomrapes	Orobanche spp.
Eurasian water milfoil	Myriophyllum spicatum
Frogbit	Limnobium laevigatum
Gamba grass	Andropogon gayanus
Hawkweed	Hieracium aurantiacum
Karroo thorn	Vachellia karroo
Kochea	Bassia scoparia
Koster's curse	Clidemia hirta
Lagarosiphon	Lagarosiphon major
Mexican feather grass	Nassella tenuissima
Miconia	Miconia spp.
Mikania vine	Mikania micrantha
Parthenium weed	Parthenium hysterophorus
Rubber vine	Cryptostegia grandiflora
Siam weed	Chromolaena odorata
Spongeplant	Limnobium spongia
Spotted knapweed	Centaurea stoebe
Water caltrop	Trapa spp.
Water pennywort	Hydrocotyle ranunculoides
Water soldier	Stratiotes aloides
Witchweed	Striga spp.
Yellow burrhead	Limnocharis flava

=== Environmental weeds ===
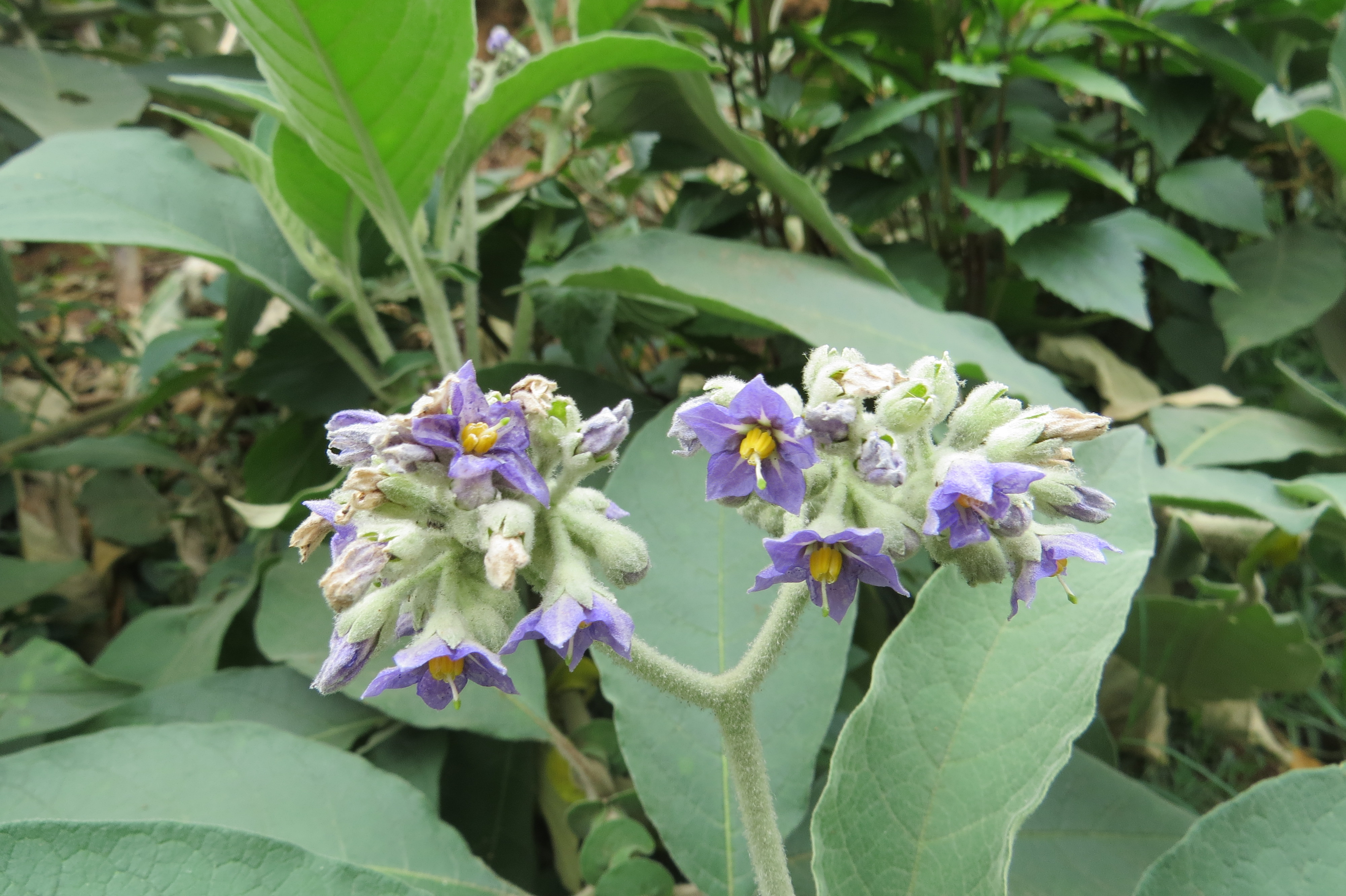
Solanum mauritianum is an environmental weed in the state, although it is not declared noxious.

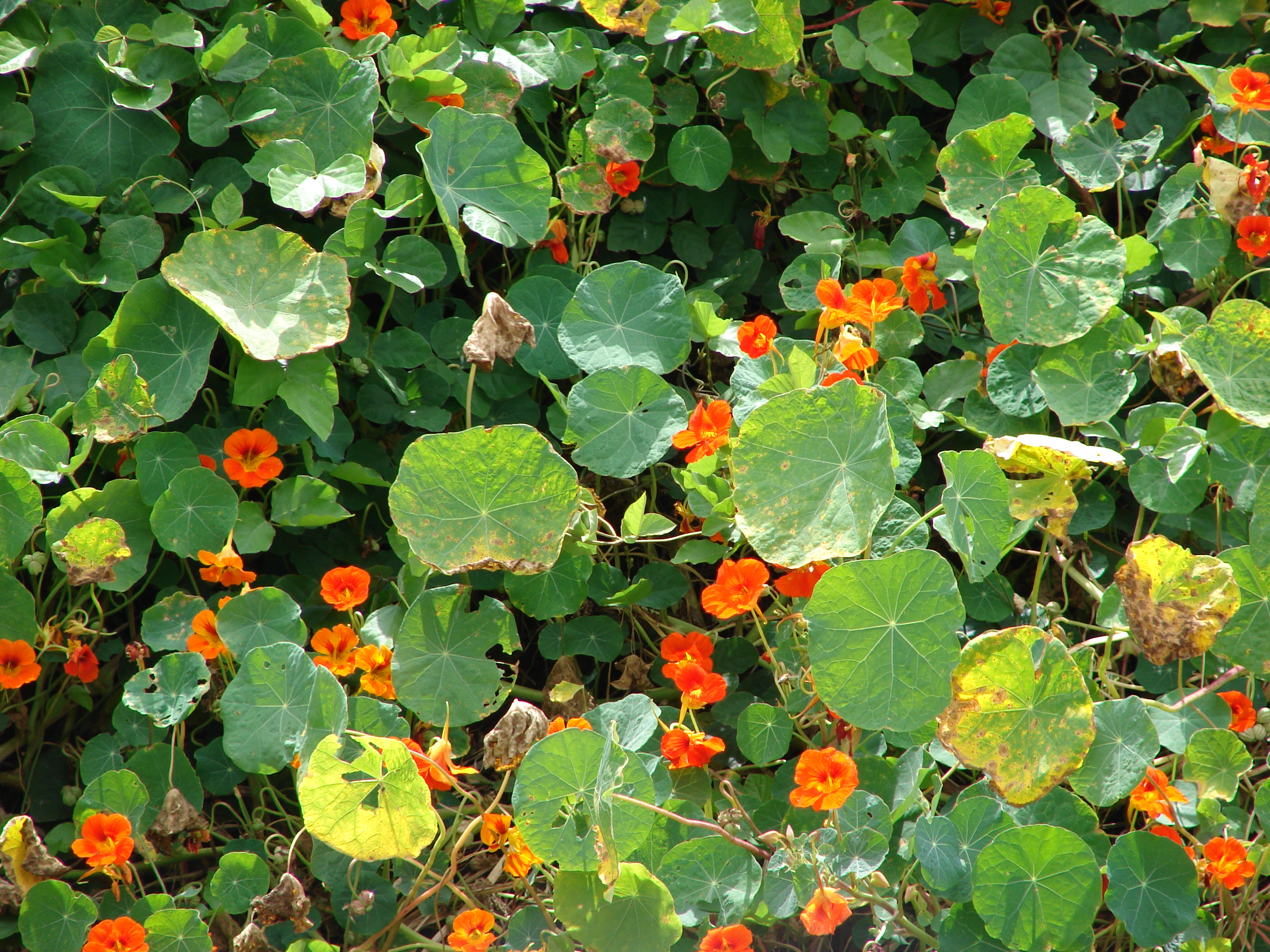
Tropaeolum majus is a widespread non-noxious weed in the state.

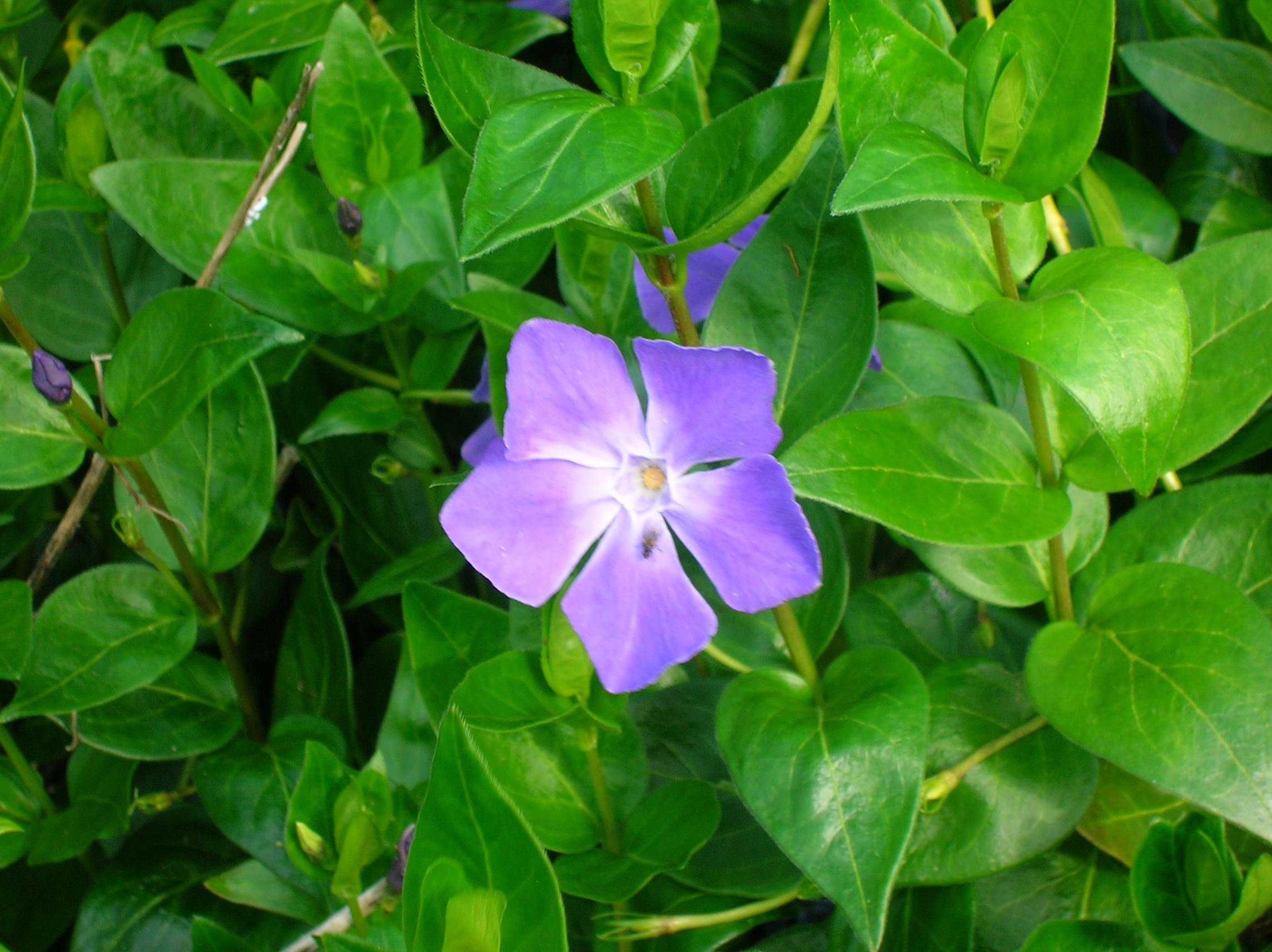
Vinca major is a non-noxious environmental weed in the state.

Plants listed below are regarded as emerging or significant environmental weeds that are not considered noxious by any state government authorities, even though some are widespread:

- Solanum mauritianum (woolly nightshade)
- Vinca major (blue perrywinkle)
- Acacia baileyana (Cootamundra wattle)
- Lomandra hystrix (river reed)
- Soliva sessilis (bindii)
- Arctotheca calendula (capeweed)
- Stellaria media (chickweed)
- Pinus radiata (radiata pine)
- Passiflora suberosa (corky passion vine)
- Tropaeolum majus (garden nasturtium)
- Acacia saligna (golden wreath wattle)
- Andropogon virginicus (whisky grass)
- Sphagneticola trilobata (Singapore daisy)
- Ludwigia peruviana (primrose yellow)
- Erigeron karvinskianus (seaside daisy)
- Opuntia ficus-indica (prickly pear)
- Sonchus oleraceus (milk thistle)
- Nephrolepis cordifolia (fishbone fern)
- Coreopsis lanceolata (lance-leaved coreopsis)
- Rhaphiolepis indica (Indian hawthorn)
- Taraxacum officinale (common dandelion)
- Convolvulus arvensis (common bindweed)
- Ardisia crenata (coral berry)
- Duranta erecta (golden dewdrop)
- Nothoscordum gracile (fragrant onion)
- Portulaca oleracea (common purslane)
- Hypochaeris radicata (flatweed)
- Urtica urens (small nettle)
- Trifolium repens (white clover)

== See also ==
- Weeds of National Significance
- Invasive species in Australia
