= Weeds of National Significance =

Problematic plant species in Australia

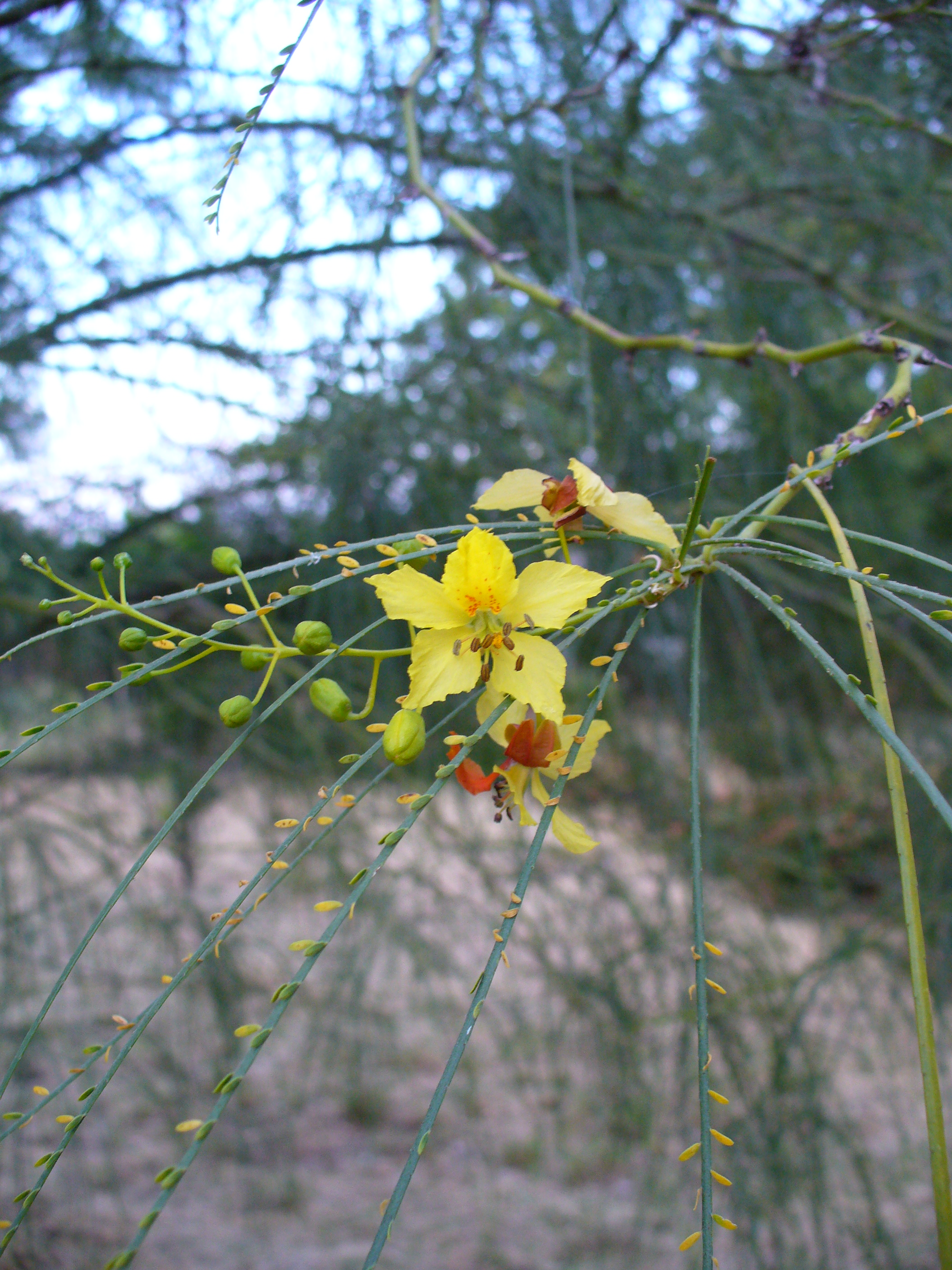
Parkinsonia aculeata is ranked as the worst weed in Australia.

Weeds of National Significance (WoNS) is a list of the most problematic plant species in Australia as determined by the federal government. Initially a list of 20 taxa were listed and given a rank based on invasiveness, impacts, potential for spread, and socioeconomic and environmental values. An expanded list of 32 taxa was released in April 2012.

== List of taxa ==
Note: The list of individual taxa is greater than the 32 WoNS.

Common name	Scientific name
African boxthorn	Lycium ferocissimum
Alligator weed	Alternanthera philoxeroides
Asparagus fern	Asparagus aethiopicus
Asparagus fern	Asparagus scandens
Athel pine	Tamarix aphylla
Bitou bush, boneseed	Chrysanthemoides monilifera subsp. monilifera and rotundata
Blackberry	Rubus fruticosus agg.
Bridal creeper	Asparagus asparagoides
Bridal veil creeper	Asparagus declinatus
Broom	Cytisus scoparius
Cabomba	Cabomba caroliniana
Cats claw vine	Dolichandra unguis-cati
Chilean needle grass	Nassella neesiana
Climbing asparagus	Asparagus africanus
Climbing asparagus fern	Asparagus plumosus
Cotton-leaved physic-nut	Jatropha gossypifolia
Delta arrowhead	Sagittaria platyphylla
Fireweed	Senecio madagascariensis
Flax-leaved broom	Genista linifolia
Gamba grass	Andropogon gayanus
Gorse	Ulex europaeus
Hymenachne	Hymenachne amplexicaulis
Lantana	Lantana camara
Mesquite	Prosopis spp.
Madeira vine	Anredera cordifolia
Mimosa	Mimosa pigra
Montpellier broom	Genista monspessulana
Parkinsonia	Parkinsonia aculeata
Parthenium weed	Parthenium hysterophorus
Pond apple	Annona glabra
Prickly acacia	Vachellia nilotica ssp. indica
Prickly pear	Austrocylindropuntia spp.
Prickly pear	Cylindropuntia spp.
Prickly pear	Opuntia spp.
Rubber vine	Cryptostegia grandiflora
Salvinia	Salvinia molesta
Serrated tussock	Nassella trichotoma
Silver nightshade	Solanum elaeagnifolium
Water hyacinth	Eichhornia crassipes
Willows except weeping willows, pussy willow and sterile pussy willow	Salix spp. except S. babylonica, S. X calodendron and S. X reichardtiji

== See also ==
- Invasive species in Australia
- Environmental issues in Australia
- Flora of Australia
- List of invasive plant species in New South Wales
