= Acrocercops serriformis =

Scientific classification
- Kingdom: Animalia
- Phylum: Arthropoda
- Class: Insecta
- Order: Lepidoptera
- Family: Gracillariidae
- Genus: Acrocercops
- Species: A. serriformis

Binomial name
- Acrocercops serriformis Meyrick, 1930

Species of moth

Acrocercops serriformis is a moth of the family Gracillariidae. It is known from Indonesia (Java), Malaysia (Sabah) and Guadalcanal.

The larvae feed on Jatropha gossypifolia, Ricinus communis and Bauhinia species. They probably mine the leaves of their host plant.
