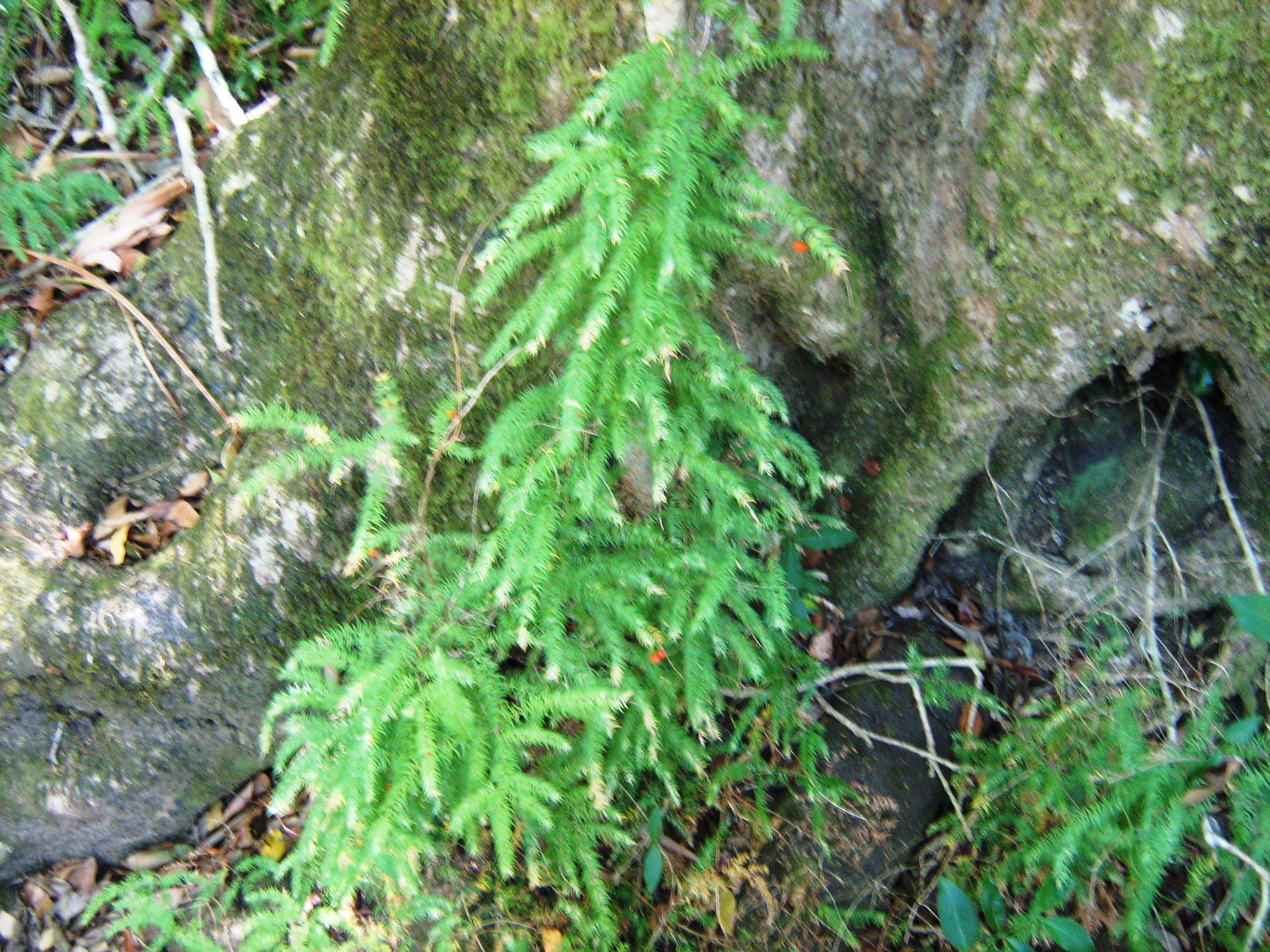

Scientific classification
- Kingdom: Plantae
- Clade: Tracheophytes
- Clade: Angiosperms
- Clade: Monocots
- Order: Asparagales
- Family: Asparagaceae
- Subfamily: Asparagoideae
- Genus: Asparagus
- Species: A. scandens

Binomial name
- Asparagus scandens Thunb. (1794)

= Asparagus scandens =

Species of vine

Asparagus scandens (also known as climbing asparagus fern or krulkransie) is a flowering plant native to South Africa in the genus Asparagus. Despite one of its common names, it is not related to ferns.

== Description ==
A hardy scrambling or climbing perennial with finely divided leaf-like Cladodes and underground tuibers. It prefers shady areas and moisture, but can tolerate some drought. Unlike other asparagus ferns, this species does not grow thorns.

It grows many tiny white drooping flowers that are followed by small orange, later red spherical fruit. These attract birds which help to disperse them.

== Distribution and habitat ==
It is endemic to the shady afro-montane forests of the Western Cape, South Africa. Here it can be found from the indigenous woods and kloofs of Cape Town, eastwards as far as the Tsitsikamma Mountains.

Cultivated in South African gardens, it is a very useful ornamental plant for growing in deep shade. It will climb up any sticks, pillars or trellises that are available, or form a thick, feathery groundcover.

== Invasive habit ==
A. scandens is cinsidered to be an invasive species in some countries. In New Zealand it is listed on the National Pest Plant Accord, which means that it cannot be sold or distributed. In Australia it is listed on the Weeds of National Significance, a list of 32 taxa compiled by the federal government.
