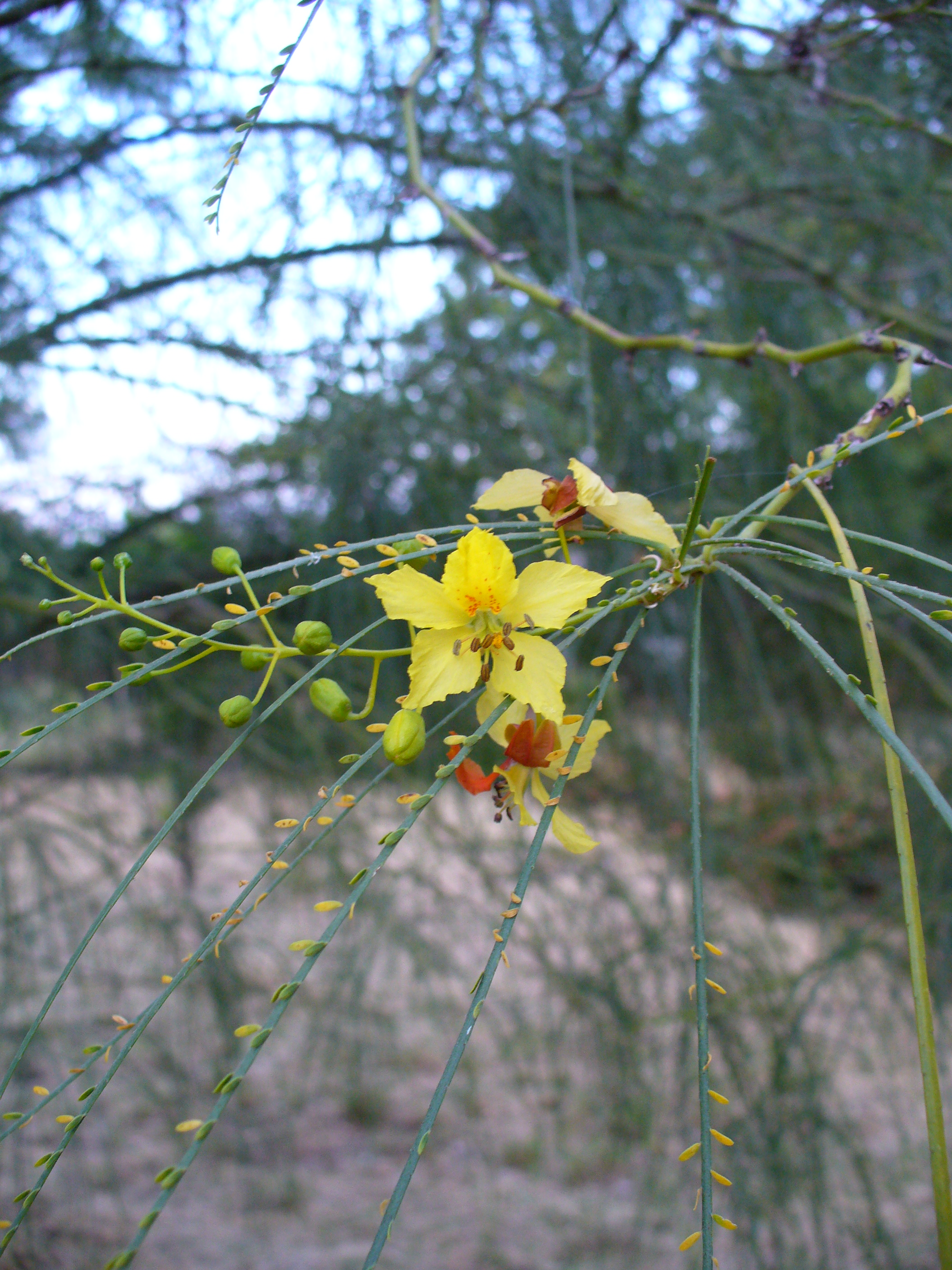
- Flowers and leaves

Scientific classification
- Kingdom: Plantae
- Clade: Tracheophytes
- Clade: Angiosperms
- Clade: Eudicots
- Clade: Rosids
- Order: Fabales
- Family: Fabaceae
- Subfamily: Caesalpinioideae
- Genus: Parkinsonia
- Species: P. aculeata

Binomial name
- Parkinsonia aculeata L.
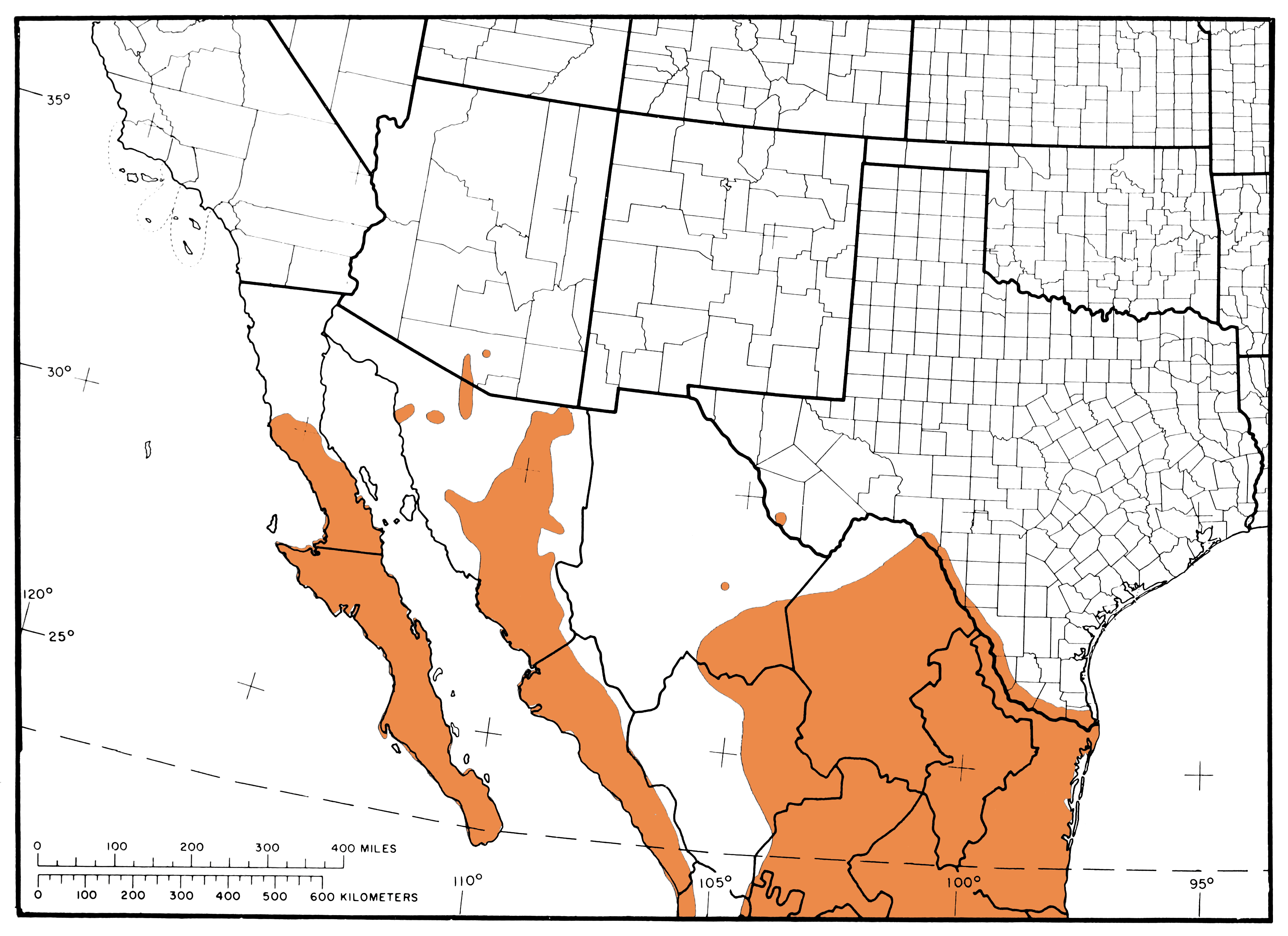
- Northern native range of Parkinsonia aculeata

Synonyms
- Inga pyriformis Jungh.; Mimosa pedunculata Hunter; Parkia harbesonii Elmer; Parkia macropoda Miq

= Parkinsonia aculeata =

Species of legume

Parkinsonia aculeata is a species of perennial flowering tree in the pea family, Fabaceae. Common names include palo verde, Mexican palo verde, Parkinsonia, Jerusalem thorn, jelly bean tree, palo de rayo, and retama.

== Etymology ==
The genus name Parkinsonia honors the English botanist John Parkinson (1567–1650), while the species Latin name aculeata refers to the thorny stem of this plant.

The name "Jerusalem thorn" stems from a mistranslation of the Spanish/Portuguese word girasol ('turning toward the sun').

== Description ==
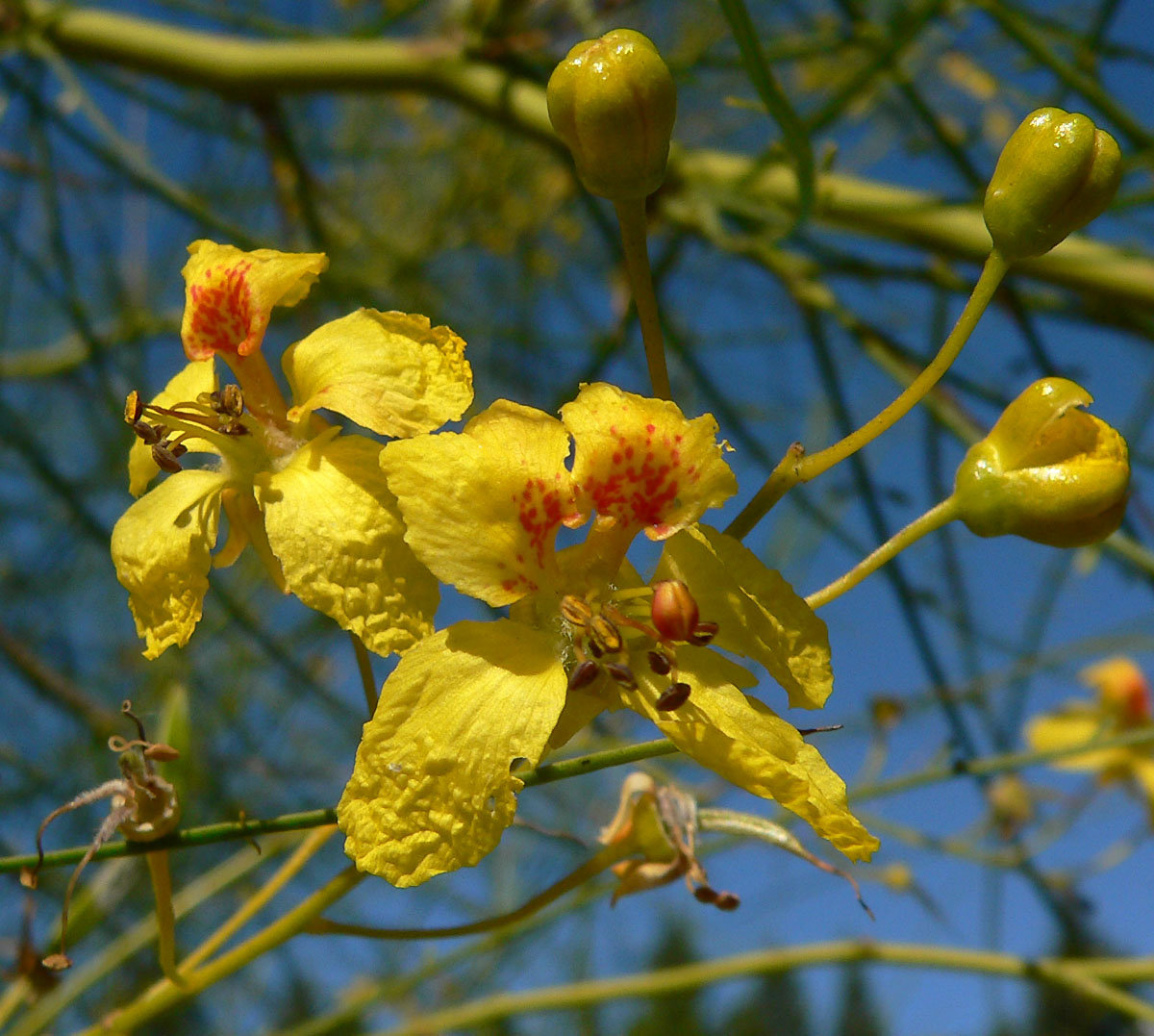
Close-up on flowers of Parkinsonia aculeata

Parkinsonia aculeata may be a spiny shrub or a small tree. It grows 2 to 8 m (6.6 to 26.2 ft) high, with a maximum height of 10 metres (33 ft). Palo verde may have single or multiple stems and many branches with pendulous leaves. The leaves and stems are hairless. The leaves are alternate and pennate (15 to 20 cm long). The flattened petiole is edged by two rows of 25–30 tiny oval leaflets; the leaflets are soon deciduous in dry weather (and during the winter in some areas) leaving the green petioles and branches to photosynthesize.

The branches grow double or triple sharp spines 7–12 mm (0.28–0.47 in) long at the axils of the leaves. The flowers are yellow- orange and fragrant, 20 mm (0.79 in) in diameter, growing from a long slender stalk in groups of eight to ten. They have five sepals and five petals, four of them clearer and rhomboid ovate, the fifth elongated, with a warmer yellow and purple spots at the base. The flowering period is in the middle months of spring (March–April or September–October). The flowers are pollinated by bees. The fruit is a seedpod, leathery in appearance, light brown when mature.

== Invasive problems ==
P. aculeata is a major invasive species in Australia, as it is listed as a Weed of National Significance and is ranked as Australia's worst weed. It is also a major problem in parts of tropical Africa, Hawaii, and other Islands in the Pacific Ocean.

It was introduced to Australia as an ornamental tree and for shade around 1900. It is now a serious weed widespread through Western Australia, the Northern Territory and Queensland, covering about 8,000 km^{2} (3,100 sq mi) of land, and has the potential to spread through most of the semi-arid to subhumid tropical area in Australia.

It forms dense thickets, preventing access for humans, native animals and livestock to waterways. The fruits (seedpods) float, and the plant spreads by dropping pods into water, or pods are washed downstream by seasonal flooding. Without the scarifying received by tumbling in streambeds, the seeds are slow to germinate.

Several control methods are used to reduce the existing population and the spread of P. aculeata in Australia. Three insects have been introduced to Australia for biological control; the parkinsonia bean weevils, Penthobruchus germaini and Mimosestes ulkei, both have larvae that specifically eat the seeds from parkinsonia pods and are proving to be a useful management tool, and the parkinsonia leaf bug, Rhinacloa callicrates, which destroys photosynthetic tissues but has had little overall impact on the plant. Fire is effective for young trees; mechanical removal and herbicides are also used.

== Distribution ==
P. aculeata is native to the southwestern United States and northern Mexico south to Galapagos Islands and northern Argentina. It has been introduced in Africa, Australia, India, Pakistan and Spain.

== Habitat ==
Parkinsonia aculeata has a high tolerance to drought, simply attaining shorter stature. In moist and humus-rich environments it becomes a taller, spreading shade tree. This plant prefers a full sun exposure, but can grow on a wide range of dry soils (sand dunes, clay, alkaline and chalky soils, etc.), at an altitude of 0–1,500 metres (0–4,921 ft) above sea level.

== Uses ==
In Mexico, the leaves are steeped and made into medicine for fever and epilepsy.

The foliage is seldom browsed by livestock due to the spines.

== Gallery ==
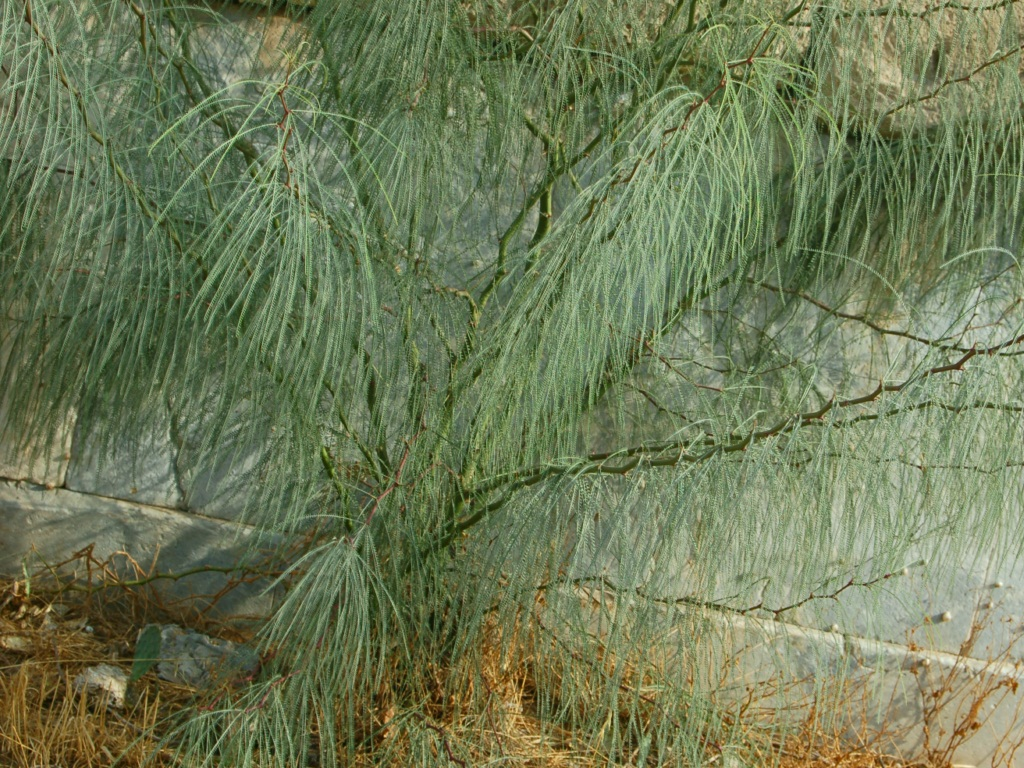
Shrub of Parkinsonia aculeata

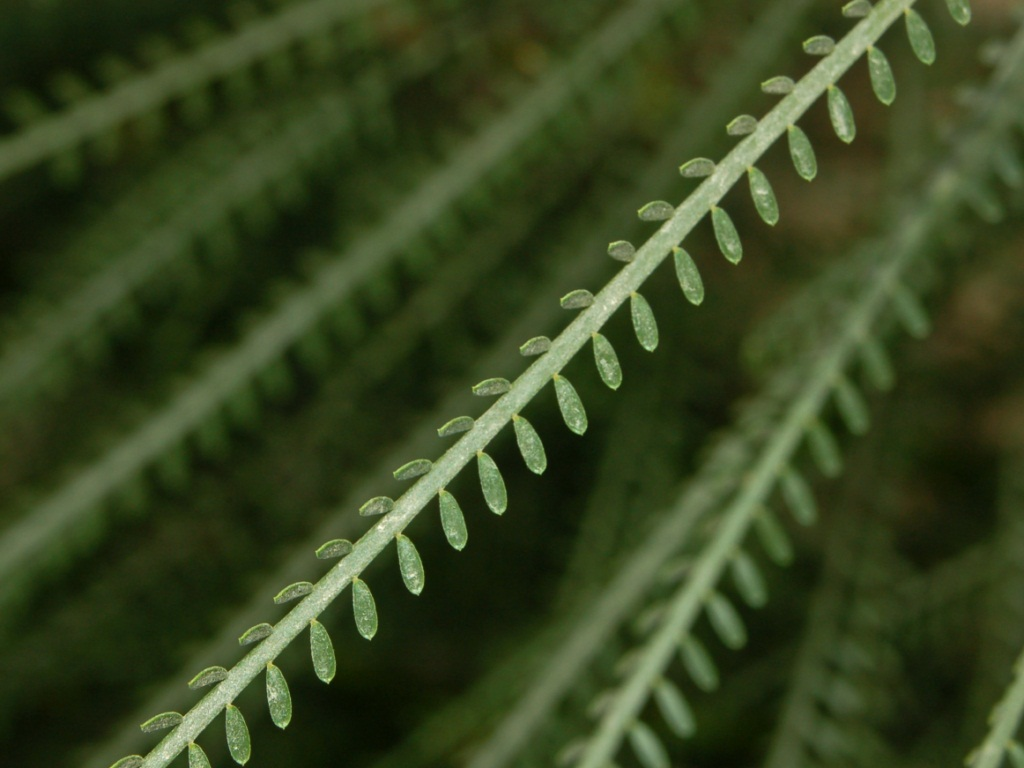
Leaflets of Parkinsonia aculeata

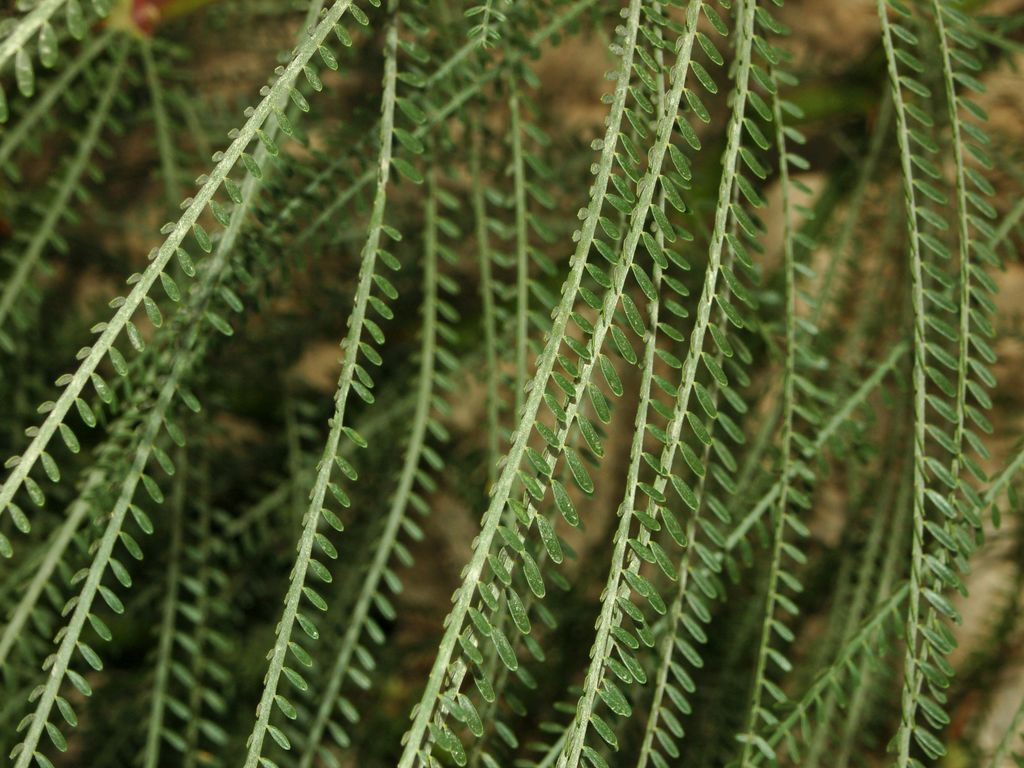
Leaflets of Parkinsonia aculeata

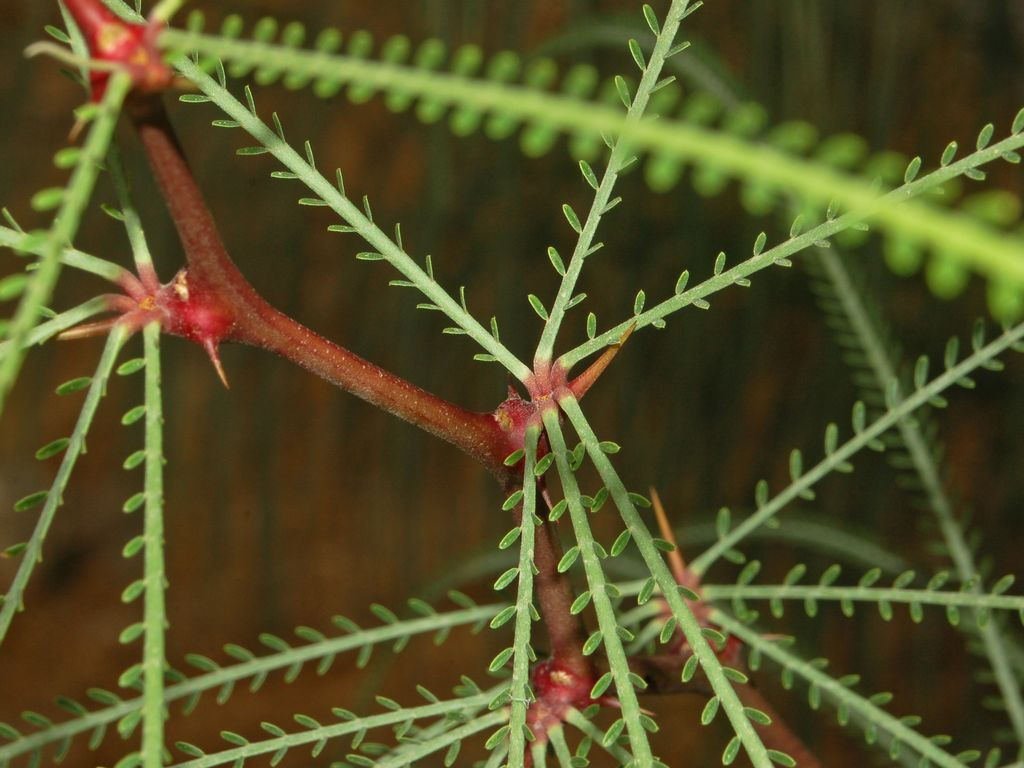
Thorns on Parkinsonia aculeata

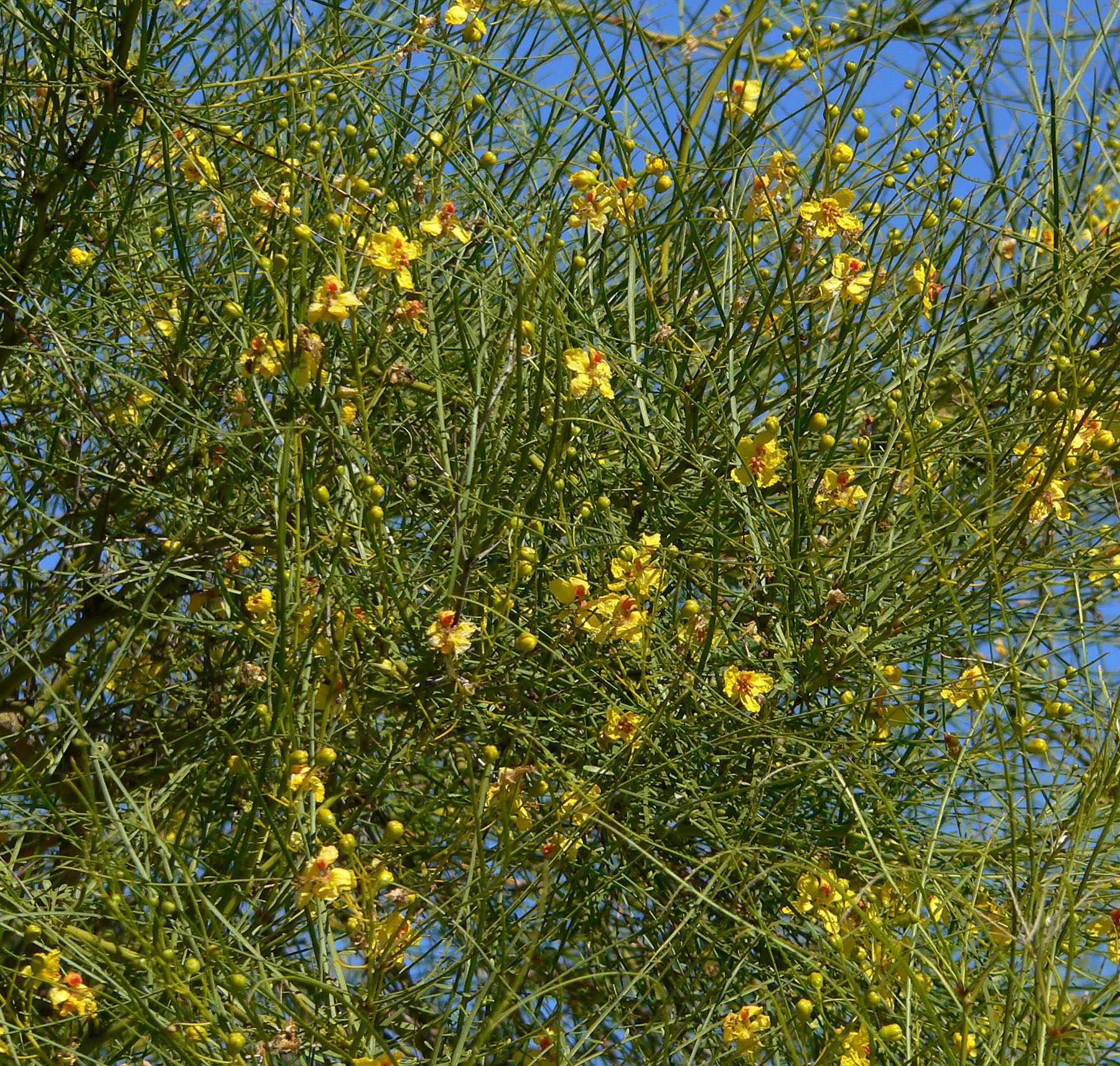
Plant of Parkinsonia aculeata

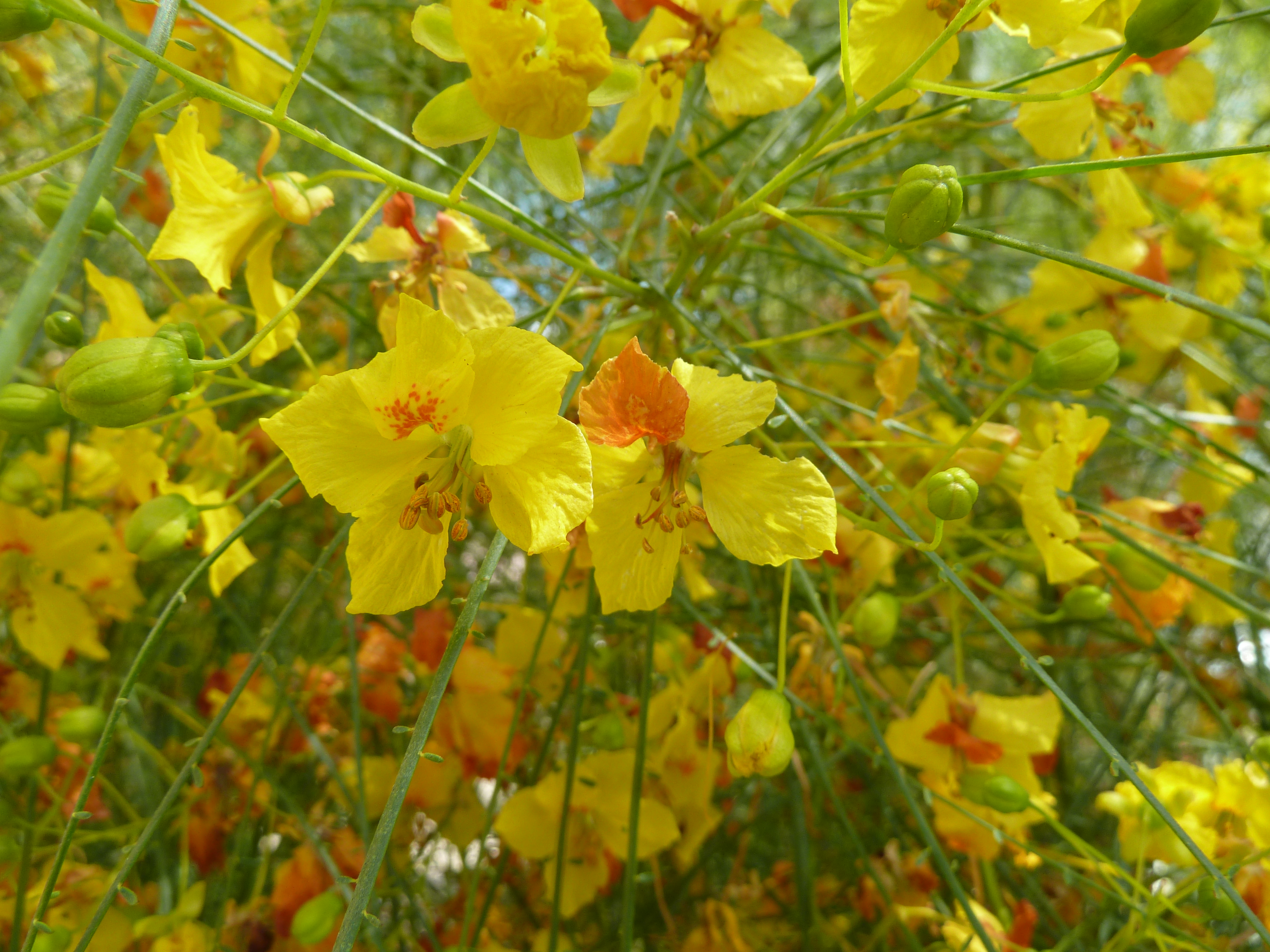
Flowers of Parkinsonia aculeata
