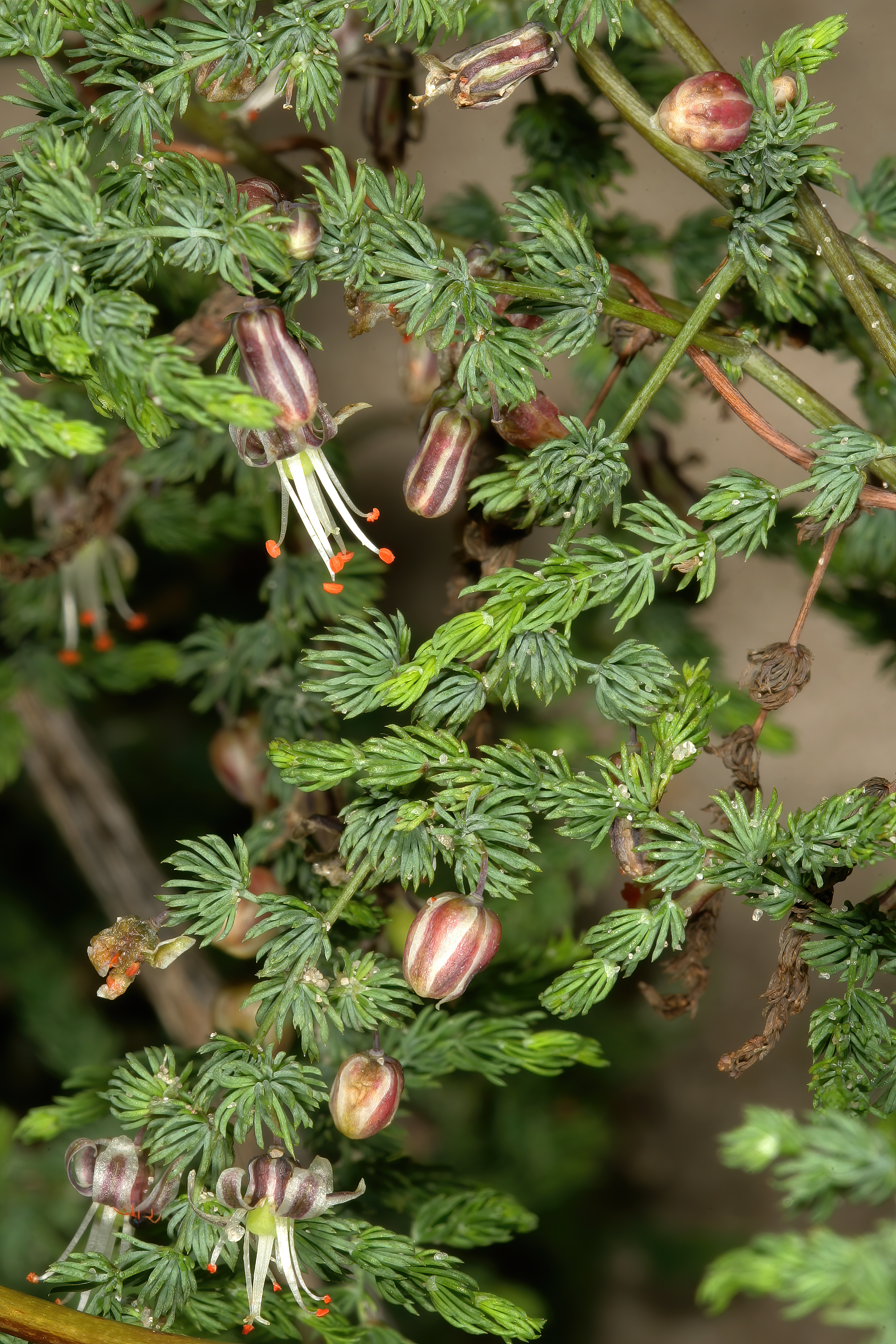

Scientific classification
- Kingdom: Plantae
- Clade: Tracheophytes
- Clade: Angiosperms
- Clade: Monocots
- Order: Asparagales
- Family: Asparagaceae
- Subfamily: Asparagoideae
- Genus: Asparagus
- Species: A. declinatus

Binomial name
- Asparagus declinatus L.

= Asparagus declinatus =

Species of plant

Asparagus declinatus, common name bridal veil, is a species of Asparagus plant. It is native to the Cape Provinces, Madagascar and Namibia and has been introduced into Central America, South Australia and Western Australia. It is a perennial vine. It is categorized as invasive in some areas.
