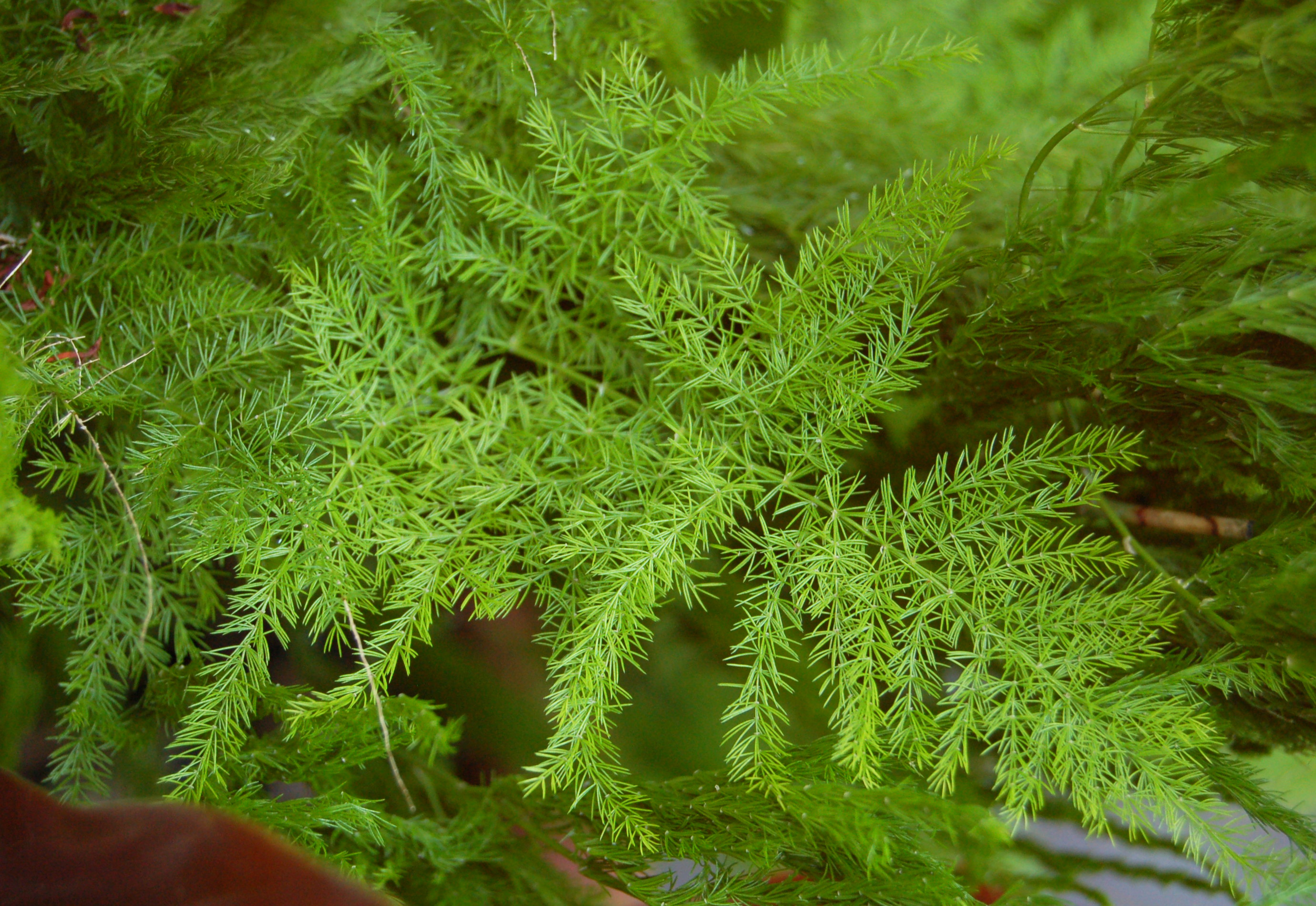

Scientific classification
- Kingdom: Plantae
- Clade: Embryophytes
- Clade: Tracheophytes
- Clade: Spermatophytes
- Clade: Angiosperms
- Clade: Monocots
- Order: Asparagales
- Family: Asparagaceae
- Subfamily: Asparagoideae
- Genus: Asparagus
- Species: A. setaceus

Binomial name
- Asparagus setaceus (Kunth) Jessop

Synonyms
- Asparagopsis setacea Kunth; Asparagus asiaticus var. amharicus Pic.Serm.; Asparagus lujae De Wild.; Asparagus plumosus Baker; Asparagus plumosus nanus Van Geert; Asparagus plumosus var. tenuissimus (Van Geert) L.H.Bailey; Asparagus tenuissimus Van Geert; Asparagus zanzibaricus Baker; Protasparagus plumosus (Baker) Oberm.; Protasparagus setaceus (Kunth) Oberm.

= Asparagus setaceus =

Species of plant

Asparagus setaceus, with the common names of common asparagus fern, asparagus grass, lace fern, climbing asparagus, or ferny asparagus, is a plant in the family Asparagaceae native to southern Africa. Despite its common name, the plant is not a true fern, but has leaves that resemble one.

== Naming ==
Originally described by the German botanist Carl Sigismund Kunth, its Latin specific epithet setaceus means "hairy".

== Description ==
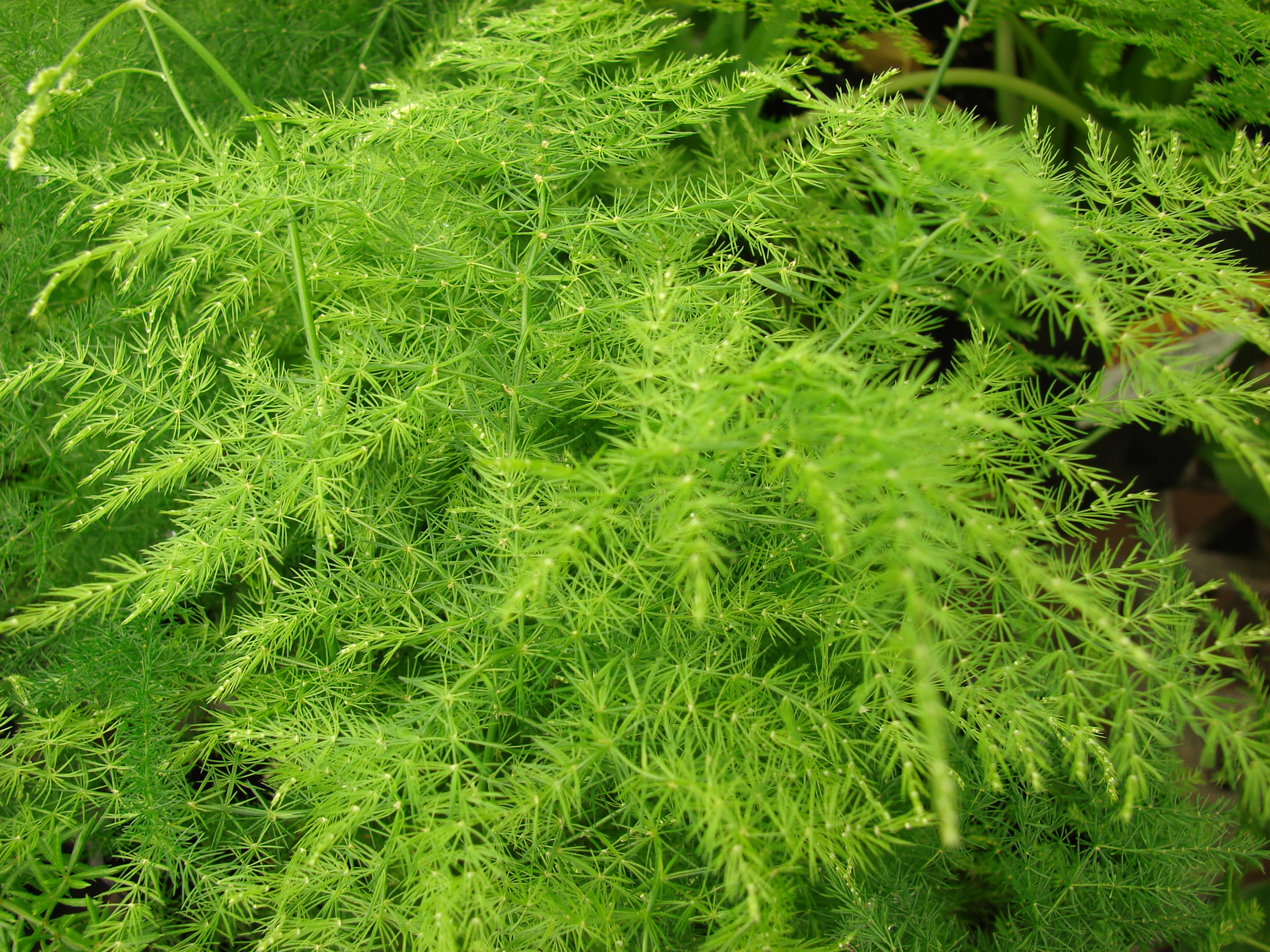
Asparagus setaceus foliage.

Asparagus setaceus is a scrambling evergreen perennial with tough green stems and leaves, which may reach several metres in length. The leaves are actually leaf-like cladodes up to 7 mm long by 0.1 mm in diameter, which arise in clumps of up to 15 from the stem, making a fine, soft green fern-like foliage. Sharp barbed thorns occur on the stem. Occurring from spring to autumn, the small greenish-white bell-shaped flowers are 0.4 cm long, and are followed by small green berries, which blacken with maturity. They are reportedly toxic upon consumption. If eaten, they can lead to diarrhea and abdominal pain.

== Distribution ==
Asparagus setaceus is native to Southern Africa, extending south west as far as Calitzdorp in the Karoo.

It is grown elsewhere as an ornamental plant and has become an invasive species in several locations where it has been introduced.

== Cultivation ==
Asparagus setaceus is cultivated as an ornamental plant, for planting in garden and containers, and as a house plant. The attractive foliage is also used in floral arrangements. It is hardy to 1 °C (34 °F), but does not tolerate being frozen. Therefore in temperate zones it is normally cultivated indoors in bright, indirect light.

This plant has gained the Royal Horticultural Society's Award of Garden Merit.

== Invasive species ==
In Australia it is considered an invasive species and its hardiness has helped it become a weed in Lord Howe and Norfolk Islands. Other areas that regard it as an invasive species and noxious weed include the North Coast of New South Wales, and Queensland.

== Toxicity ==
Asparagus setaceus is toxic to many domestic animals, including dogs and cats, and if they ingest the berries, vomiting, diarrhea, abdominal pain and allergic dermatitis may result. The toxic agent within the plant is sapogenin, a naturally occurring steroid.
