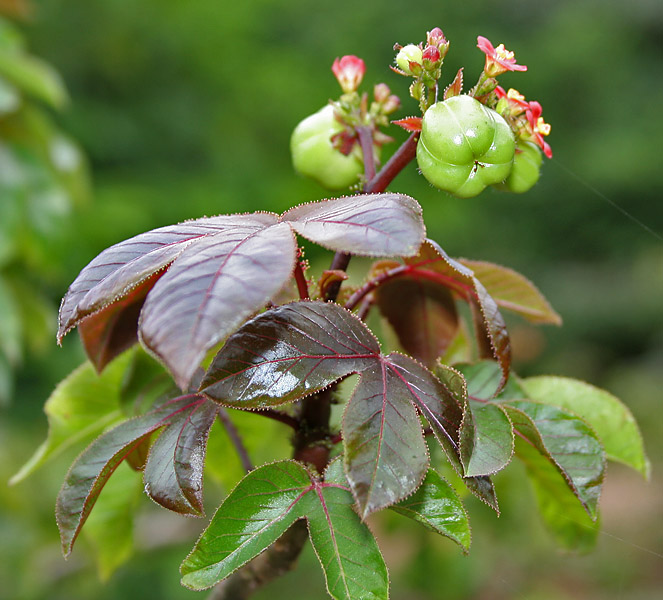

Conservation status
- Least Concern (IUCN 3.1)

Scientific classification
- Kingdom: Plantae
- Clade: Embryophytes
- Clade: Tracheophytes
- Clade: Spermatophytes
- Clade: Angiosperms
- Clade: Eudicots
- Clade: Rosids
- Order: Malpighiales
- Family: Euphorbiaceae
- Genus: Jatropha
- Species: J. gossypiifolia

Binomial name
- Jatropha gossypiifolia Carl Linnaeus

= Jatropha gossypiifolia =

Species of plant

Jatropha gossypiifolia, commonly known as bellyache bush, black physicnut or cotton-leaf physicnut, is a species of flowering plant in the spurge family, Euphorbiaceae. The species is native to Mexico, South America, and the Caribbean islands, but is currently spread throughout the tropics. It is declared noxious weed in Puerto Rico and is naturalised in northern Australia, including Queensland where it is listed as a Class 2 declared pest plant. It grows to 2.5–4 m (8.2–13.1 ft) high. The three lobed leaves are purple and sticky when young and become bright green with age. The small red flowers with yellow centres appear in clusters. These are followed by cherry-sized seed pods that are poisonous. Powdery mildew fungal disease was reported.

There are many common names for Jatropha gossypiifolia including: bellyache-bush, black physicnut, and cotton-leaf physicnut in English; pinon negro, pinon colorado, and tua-tua in Spanish; medicinier noir and medicinier rouge in French; mamoninha and peao-roxo in Brazil; jarak ulung in Thailand, jarak merah and sibidigua in India.

== Medicinal use ==
Several human and veterinary uses in traditional medicine are described for different parts (leaves, stems, roots, seeds, and latex) and preparations (infusion, decoction, and maceration, among others) based on this plant, by different routes (oral or topical). The most frequent reports concern its antihypertensive, anti-inflammatory, antiophidian, analgesic, antipyretic, antimicrobial, healing, antianemic, antidiabetic, and antihemorrhagic activities, among many other examples. Other uses are also related to this plant, such as biodiesel production, pesticide, insecticide, vermifuge, ornamentation, and even its use in religious rituals.

The American Instructor, a reference book written by Benjamin Franklin, states it can be used as an abortion tonic, along with pennyroyal:

Now I am upon Female Infirmities, it will not be unreasonable to touch upon a common Complaint among unmarried women, namely The Suppression of the Courses. This don't only disparage their Complexions, but fills them besides with sundry Disorders. For this Misfortune, you must purge with Highland Flagg (commonly called Belly ach Root) a Week before you expect to be out of Order; and repeat the same two Days after: the next Morning drink a Quarter of a Pint of Pennyroyal Water, or Decoction, and as much again at Night when you go to Bed. Continue this 9 Days running; and after resting 3 Days, go on with it for 9 more. Ride out every fair Day, stir nimbly about your Affairs, and breathe as much as possible in the open Air.

— George Fisher, Anne Fisher (pub. Benjamin Franklin and D. Hall), The American Instructor, Or, Young Man's Best Companion (1758)

The herb has been traditionally used as an oral contraceptive and abortifacient, and ethanol extracts have effectiveness in reducing fertility in rats. though the identity of the chemicals responsible for endocrine disruption are not yet known.

== Economic importance ==
- Vertebrate poisons: mammals
- Weed: potential seed contaminant

== Image gallery ==
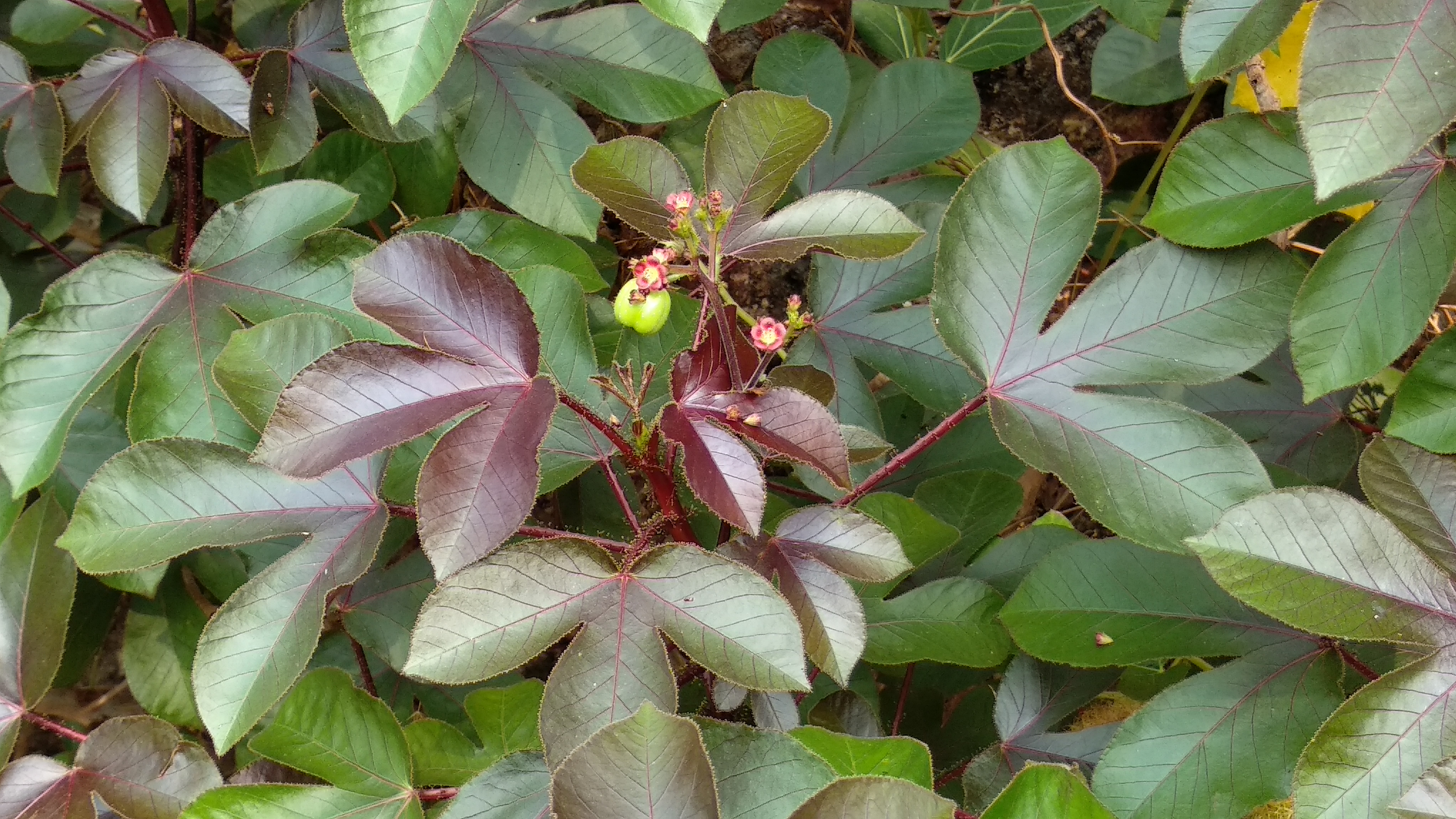
Jatropha gossypiifolia

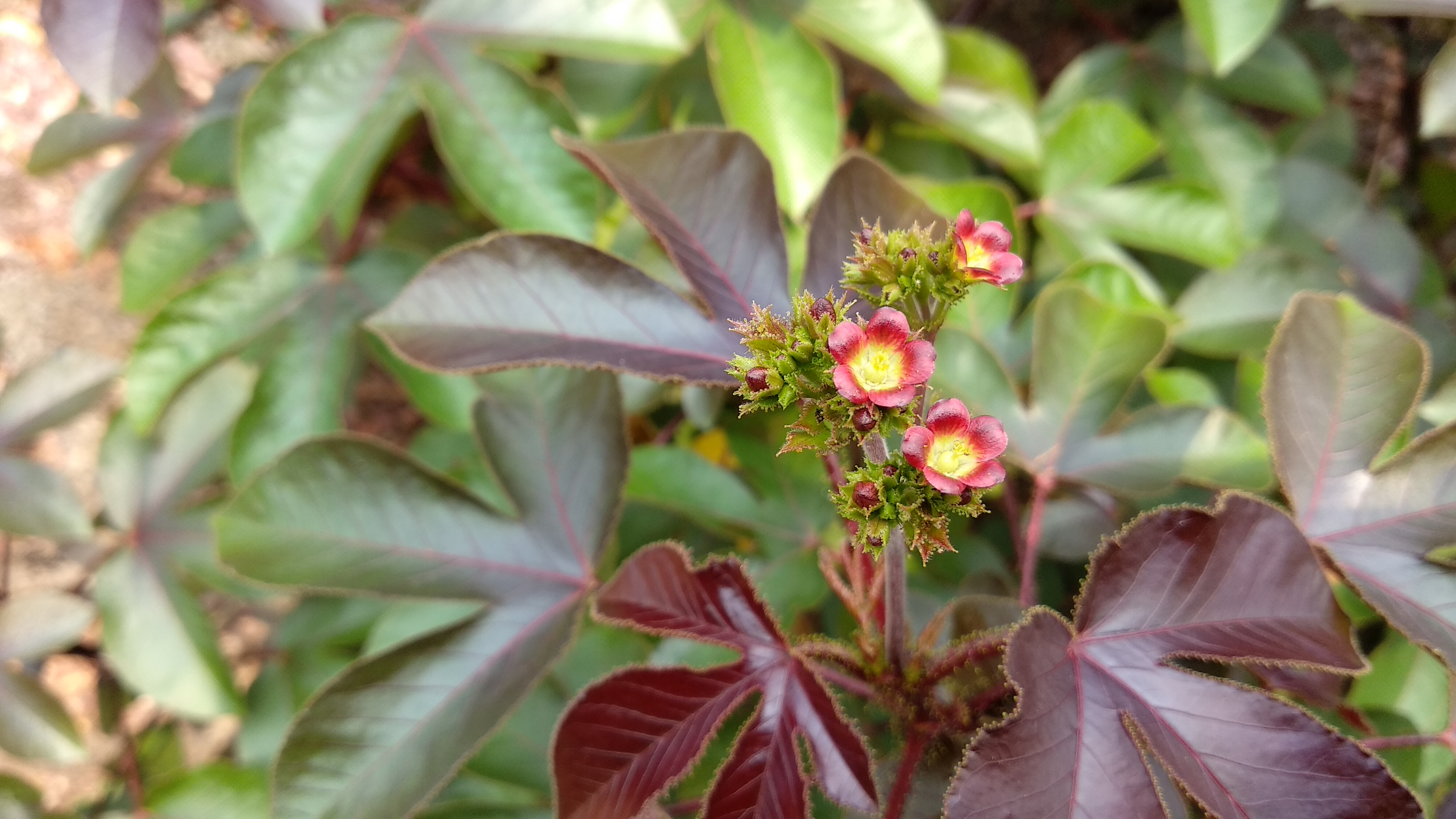
Jatropha gossypiifolia flowers

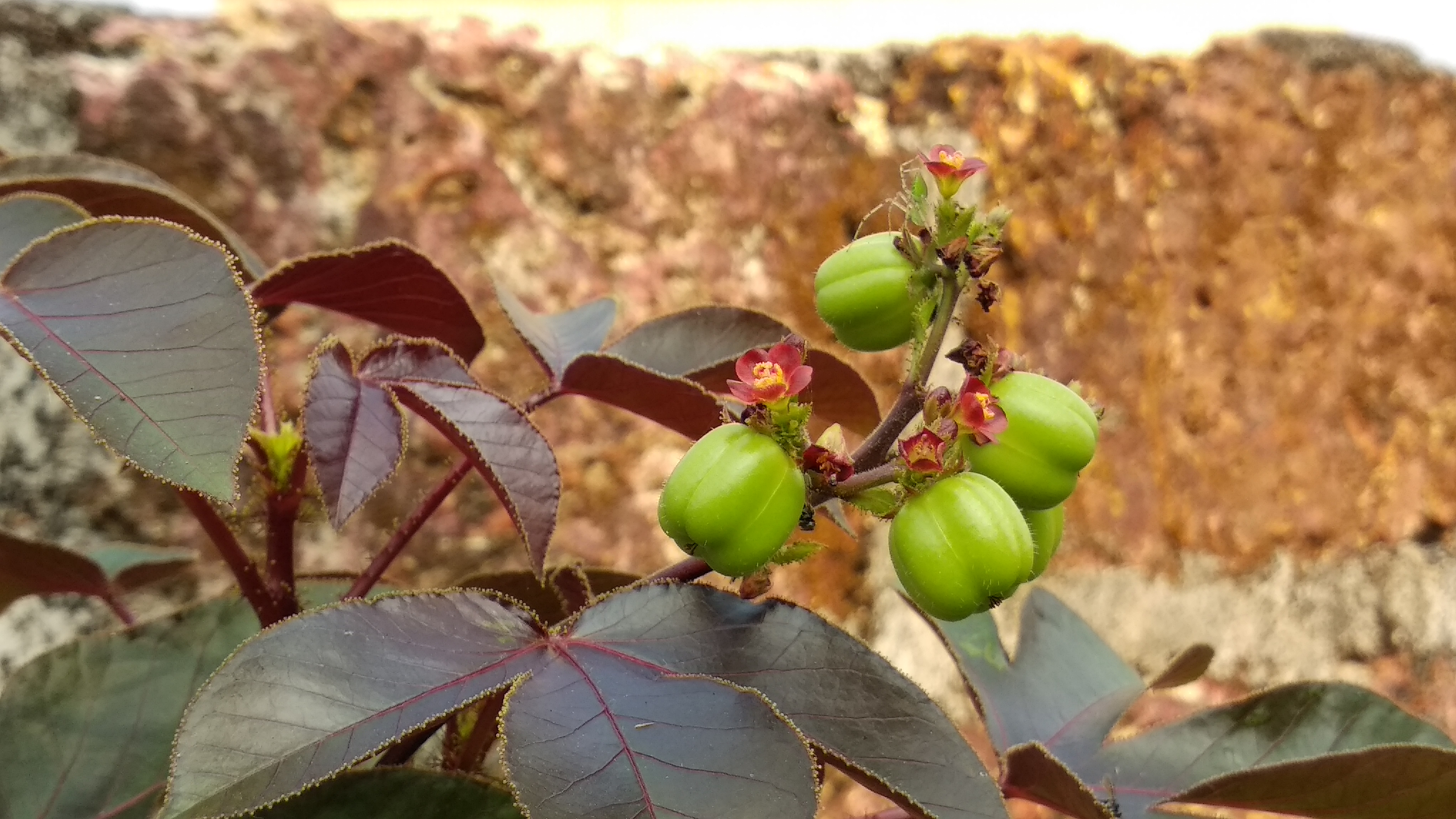
Jatropha gossypiifolia leaf flowers and fruits

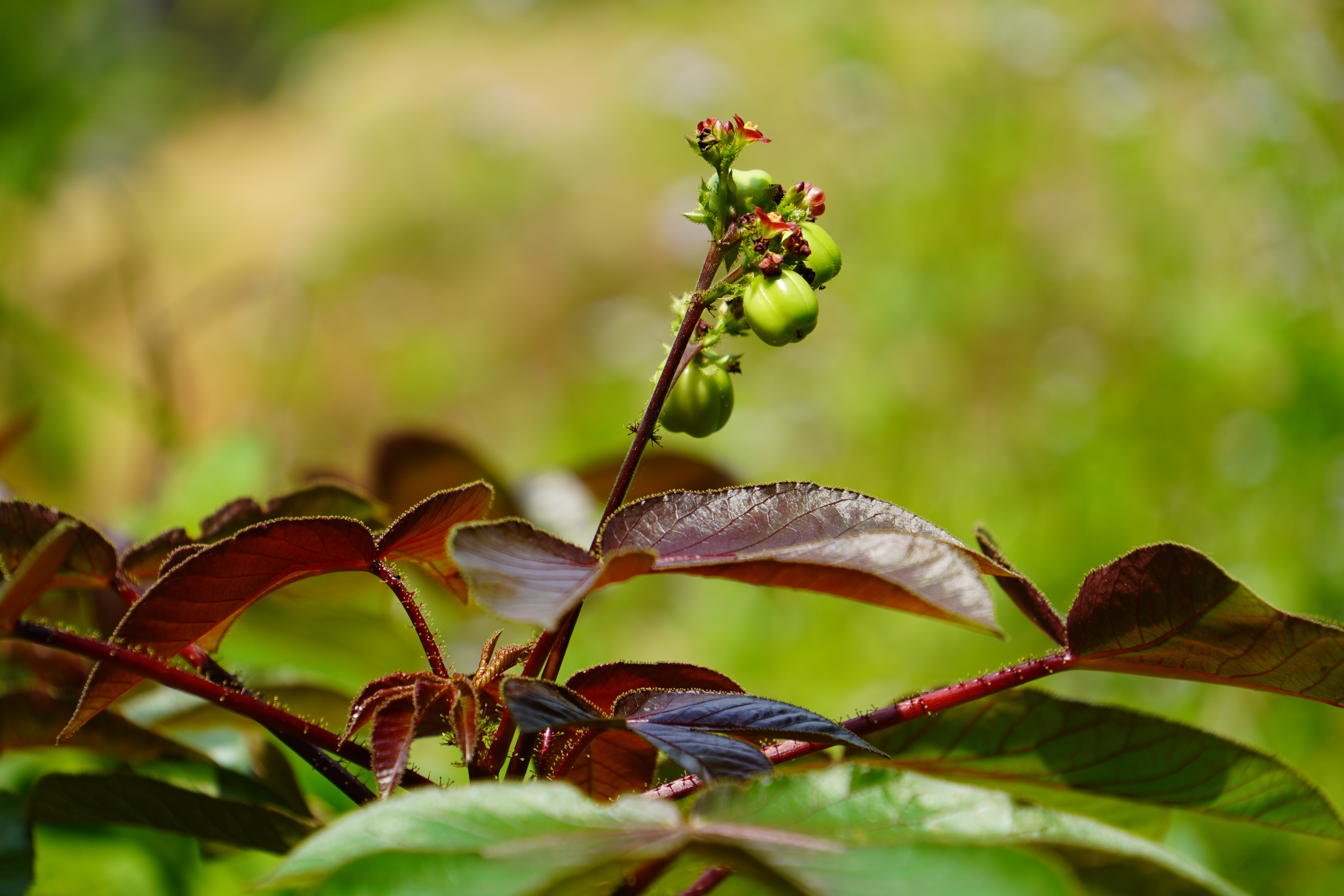
Jatropha gossypiifolia in Bangladesh
