= Foxtail fern =

Foxtail fern is a common name given to several ornamental plants in the genus Asparagus. It may refer to:

- Asparagus aethiopicus (= Asparagus sprengeri, Protasparagus aethiopicus), also called "asparagus fern", "ground asparagus", and, in South Africa, "emerald fern" and "basket asparagus"
- Asparagus declinatus, also called – "foxtail asparagus fern", "bridal veil creeper", and, in Australia, "bridal veil"
- Asparagus densiflorus (= Protasparagus densiflorus), specifically A. densiflorus 'Meyersii', also called "asparagus fern" and "bottle-brush fern"
