= Asparagus fern =

Asparagus fern is a common name given to several plants in the genus Asparagus. It may refer to:

- Asparagus aethiopicus
- Asparagus densiflorus
- Asparagus setaceus
- Asparagus virgatus
