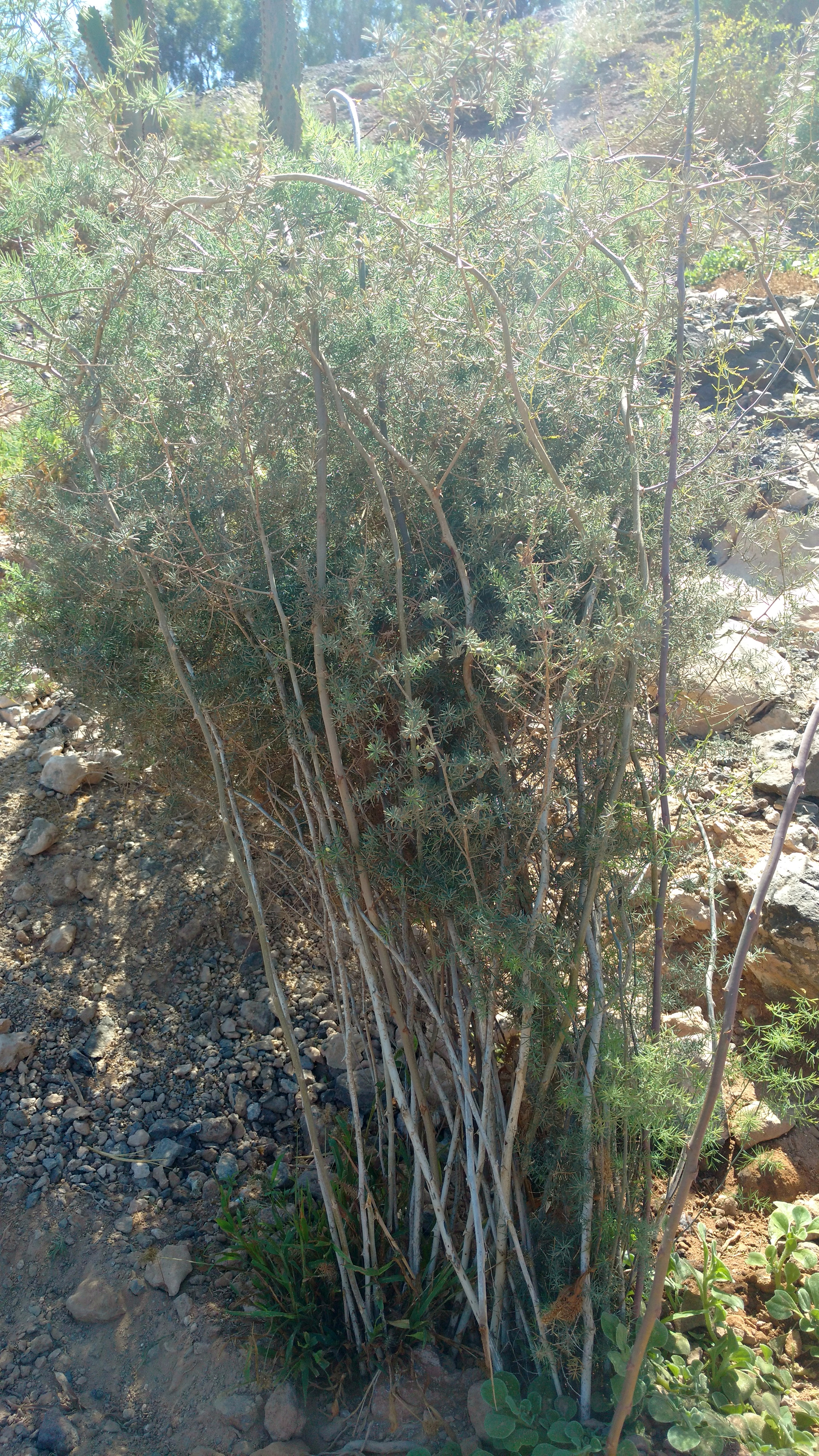

Conservation status
- Endangered (IUCN 3.1)

Scientific classification
- Kingdom: Plantae
- Clade: Tracheophytes
- Clade: Angiosperms
- Clade: Monocots
- Order: Asparagales
- Family: Asparagaceae
- Subfamily: Asparagoideae
- Genus: Asparagus
- Species: A. nesiotes

Binomial name
- Asparagus nesiotes Svent.

= Asparagus nesiotes =

Species of flowering plant

Asparagus nesiotes is a species of flowering plant in the family Asparagaceae, native to the Canary Islands and the Savage Islands (Selvagens).

Asparagus nesiotes is a source of feed for small ruminants.

Two subspecies are accepted. Asparagus nesiotes subsp. nesiotes is native to Selvagem Grande in the Selvagens. Asparagus nesiotes subsp. purpuriensis Marrero Rodr. & A.Ramos is native to Lanzarote and Fuerteventura in the Canary Islands.
