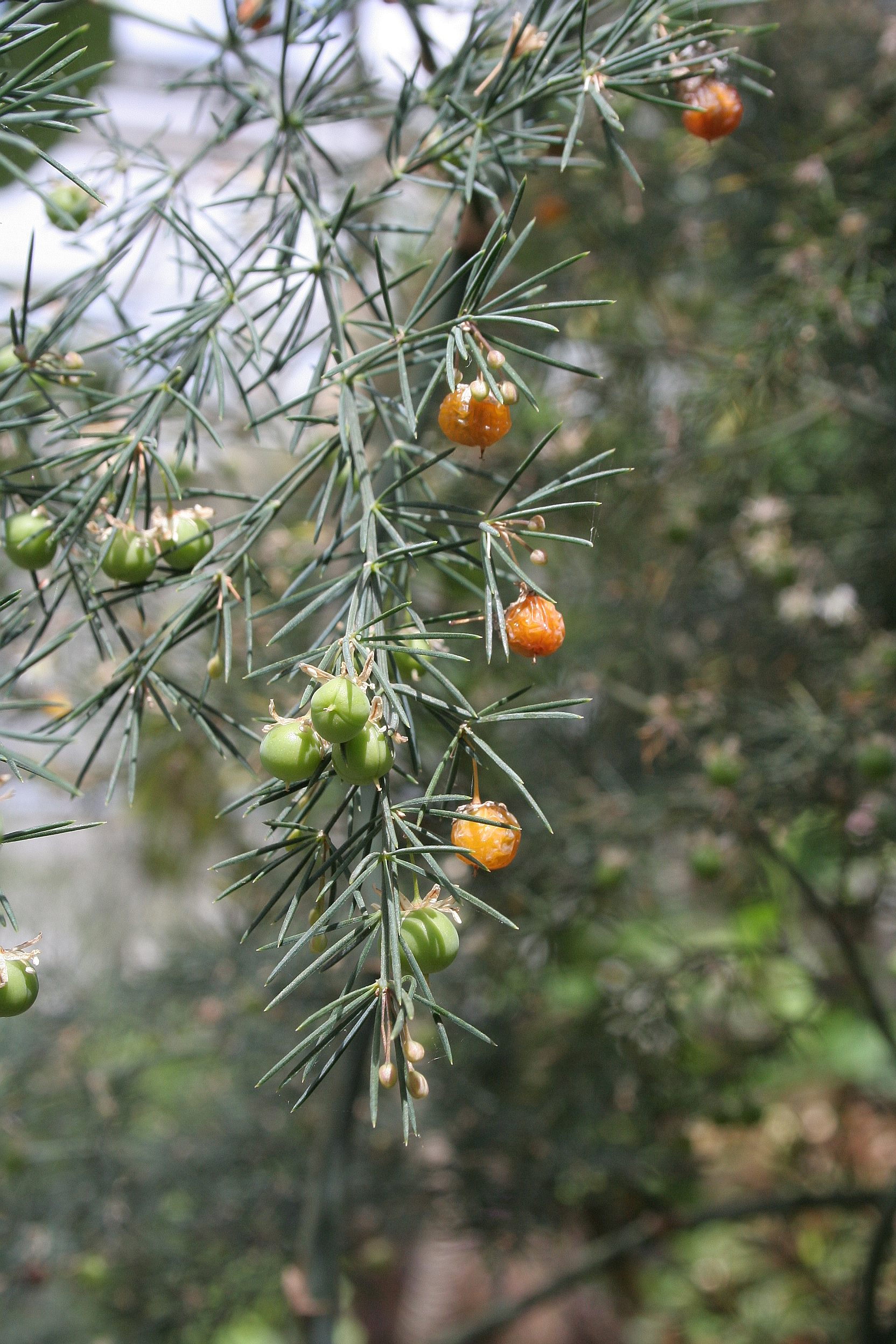

Conservation status
- Endangered (IUCN 3.1)

Scientific classification
- Kingdom: Plantae
- Clade: Tracheophytes
- Clade: Angiosperms
- Clade: Monocots
- Order: Asparagales
- Family: Asparagaceae
- Subfamily: Asparagoideae
- Genus: Asparagus
- Species: A. fallax

Binomial name
- Asparagus fallax Svent.

= Asparagus fallax =

Species of plant

Asparagus fallax, the Monteverde asparagus, is a species of flowering plant in the family Asparagaceae.

== Description ==
Within the genus, it is distinguished by its more or less erect stems, which later become twining, with numerous short, non-thorny cladodes and inflorescences with few flowers, whose tepals measure 3–4 mm. This species is included in the Catalogue of Endangered Species of the Canary Islands, as endangered, on the islands of Tenerife and La Gomera.

== Distribution and habitat ==
It is endemic to the Canary Islands. It is endemic to the laurisilva of Tenerife and La Gomera.

== Taxonomy ==
Asparagus fallax was described by Eric Ragnor Sventenius and published in Additamentum ad floram canariensem 1: 4 1960.

Etymology

See: Asparagus

fallax: epithet that comes from Latin fallere, which means "to deceive", probably because it was long confused with another similar species.
