= Asparagus multiflorus =

Scientific classification
- Kingdom: Plantae
- Clade: Tracheophytes
- Clade: Angiosperms
- Clade: Monocots
- Order: Asparagales
- Family: Asparagaceae
- Subfamily: Asparagoideae
- Genus: Asparagus
- Species: A. multiflorus

Binomial name
- Asparagus multiflorus Bak.

Species of shrub

Asparagus multiflorus ("many-flowered asparagus") is a robust shrub or climber of the Asparagus genus, that is indigenous to the southern Cape regions of South Africa.

== Description ==
A shrub or climber (reaching 2 metres (6.6 ft) in height) without any thorns.

The stems are zig-zagged, pale-green, hard and often velvety. They also have thin longitudinal lines along them.

Instead of spines, this species has triangular knobs along its branch-nodes, from which the side-shoots and leaves spread.

The 10-12mm leaves are grouped in tufts, and the white flowers appear in Summer.

This species is closely related to Asparagus africanus, but can immediately be distinguished by its lack of spines.

== Distribution ==
This species is indigenous to the southern Cape regions of South Africa. Most of its distribution is in the Eastern Cape Province, but it also extends westwards along the coast and the Little Karoo, and into the Overberg region of the Western Cape Province as far as the area around Swellendam.
