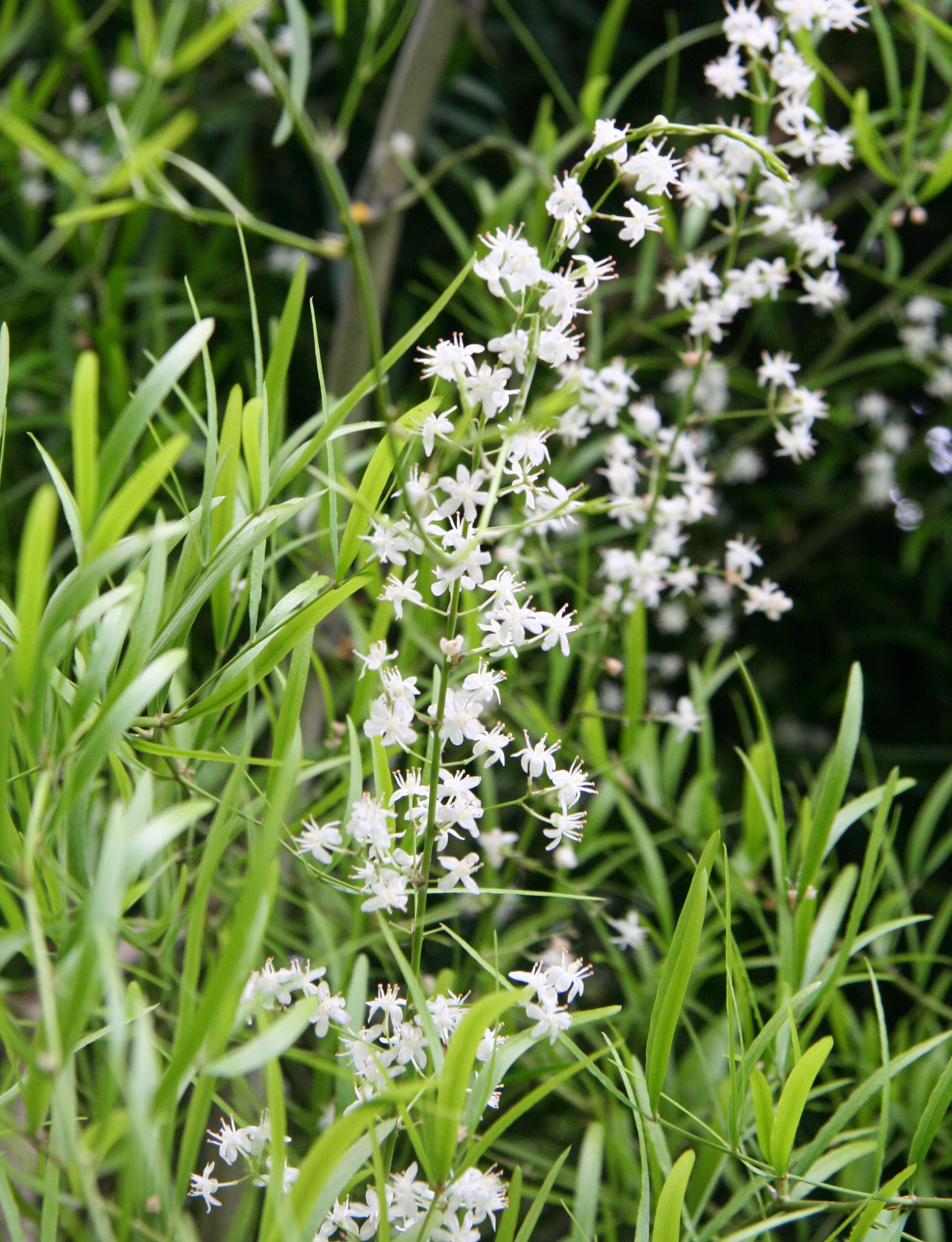

Scientific classification
- Kingdom: Plantae
- Clade: Tracheophytes
- Clade: Angiosperms
- Clade: Monocots
- Order: Asparagales
- Family: Asparagaceae
- Subfamily: Asparagoideae
- Genus: Asparagus
- Species: A. falcatus

Binomial name
- Asparagus falcatus (L.) Druce

= Asparagus falcatus =

Species of vine

Asparagus falcatus (Sicklethorn, Large Forest Asparagus, Imblekazana or Doringtou) is a large, thorny, climbing plant of the Asparagus genus, that is indigenous to South Africa and Mozambique. It is often grown as a security hedge in southern Africa.

== Appearance ==
This local Asparagus species sends up long shoots (sometimes up to 7 metres (23 ft) high) from its base of roots and massive tubers. These shoots are initially soft and curl around branches or fences. However, they soon harden, and the downward-pointing thorns help to hook the tendril onto its support - as well as providing defence. The leaves are dark-green, thin and curved.

It produces fragrant white blossoms that are followed by bright red berries, each containing a shiny black seed. The fruits attract a wide variety of birds.

== Distribution ==
In South Africa, this creeper is indigenous to the forests of the Eastern Cape and Kwazulu Natal. It also occurs in neighbouring Mozambique.

== Asparagus falcatus in cultivation ==
This rapidly growing climber can be grown in very shady parts of a garden, although it also tolerates some sun. It also prefers moist spots, though once established it can also tolerate some drought.

It serves as a very good safety hedge when planted along a fence that it can grow up through.

It can easily be propagated by seed, although it can also be grown from cuttings/trucheons.
