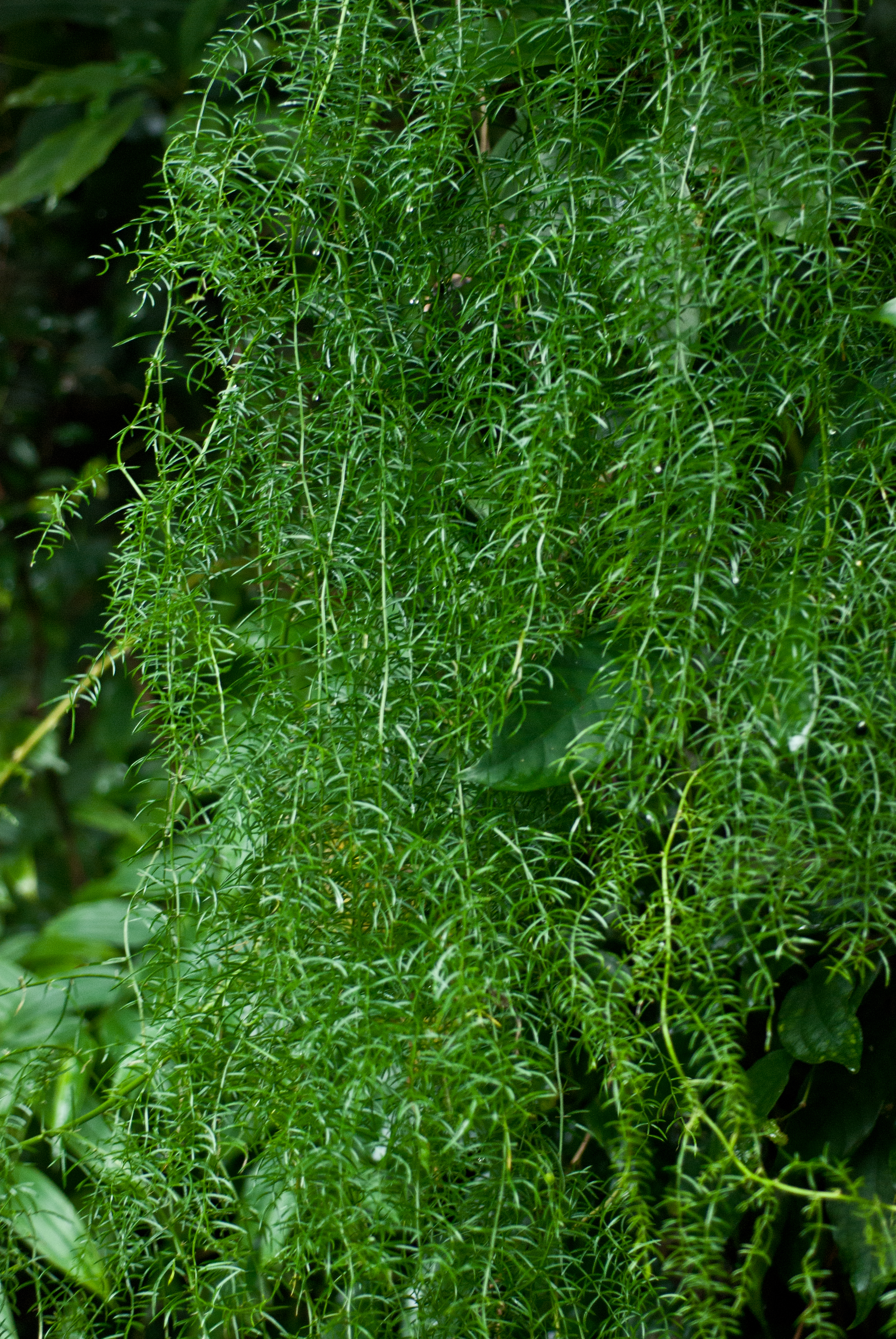

Scientific classification
- Kingdom: Plantae
- Clade: Embryophytes
- Clade: Tracheophytes
- Clade: Spermatophytes
- Clade: Angiosperms
- Clade: Monocots
- Order: Asparagales
- Family: Asparagaceae
- Subfamily: Asparagoideae
- Genus: Asparagus
- Species: A. cochinchinensis

Binomial name
- Asparagus cochinchinensis (Lour.) Merr.

Synonyms
- List: Melanthium cochinchinense Lour.; Asparagopsis sinica Miq.; Asparagus cochinchinensis var. dolichoclados F.T.Wang & Tang; Asparagus cochinchinensis var. longifolius F.T.Wang & Tang; Asparagus cochinchinensis f. pygmaeus (Makino) Yamashita & M.N.Tamura; Asparagus cochinchinensis var. pygmaeus (Makino) Ohwi; Asparagus dauricus var. elongatus Pamp.; Asparagus falcatus Thunb.; Asparagus gaudichaudianus Kunth; Asparagus insularis Hance; Asparagus lucidus Lindl.; Asparagus lucidus var. dolichocladus Merr. & Rolfe; Asparagus lucidus var. pygmaeus Makino; Asparagus sinicus (Miq.) C.H.Wright

= Asparagus cochinchinensis =

Species of flowering plant

Asparagus cochinchinensis is a species of flowering plant, sometimes called Chinese asparagus, in the subfamily Asparagoideae of the family Asparagaceae. Its dried roots are used in traditional Chinese medicine and other traditional medicinal systems in Asia.

== Description and distribution ==
Asparagus cochinchinensis is a dioecious climbing perennial with stems 1–2 m long. Its cladodes are usually borne in clusters of three and measure 0.5–8 cm long by 1–2 mm wide. The pale-green axillary flowers are usually paired, and the berries are 6–7 mm in diameter and contain one or two seeds.

The species is native to East and Southeast Asia, occurring in China, Japan, Korea, Taiwan, Cambodia, Laos, Vietnam and the northern Philippines. Its specific epithet refers to Cochinchina, a historical region of southern Vietnam. It is called thiên môn đông in Vietnamese and tiān mén dōng (天門冬) in Chinese.

== Genomics ==
A chromosome-level genome assembly of Asparagus cochinchinensis was published in 2026, providing the first publicly available reference genome for the species. The assembly spans approximately 1.3 Gb, with 10 pseudochromosomes, has a BUSCO completeness of 94.3%, and contains 48,453 predicted protein-coding genes.

== Gallery ==
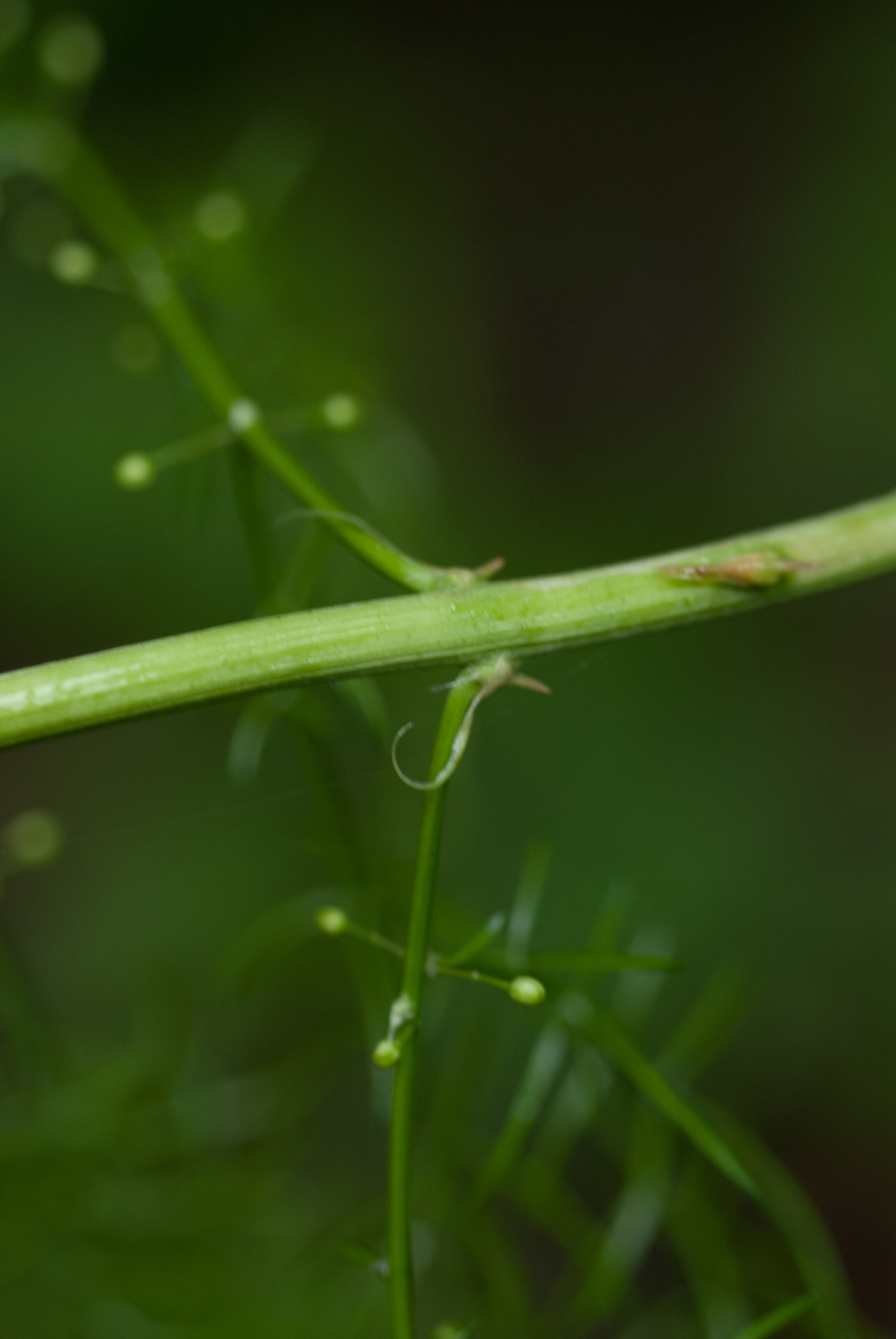

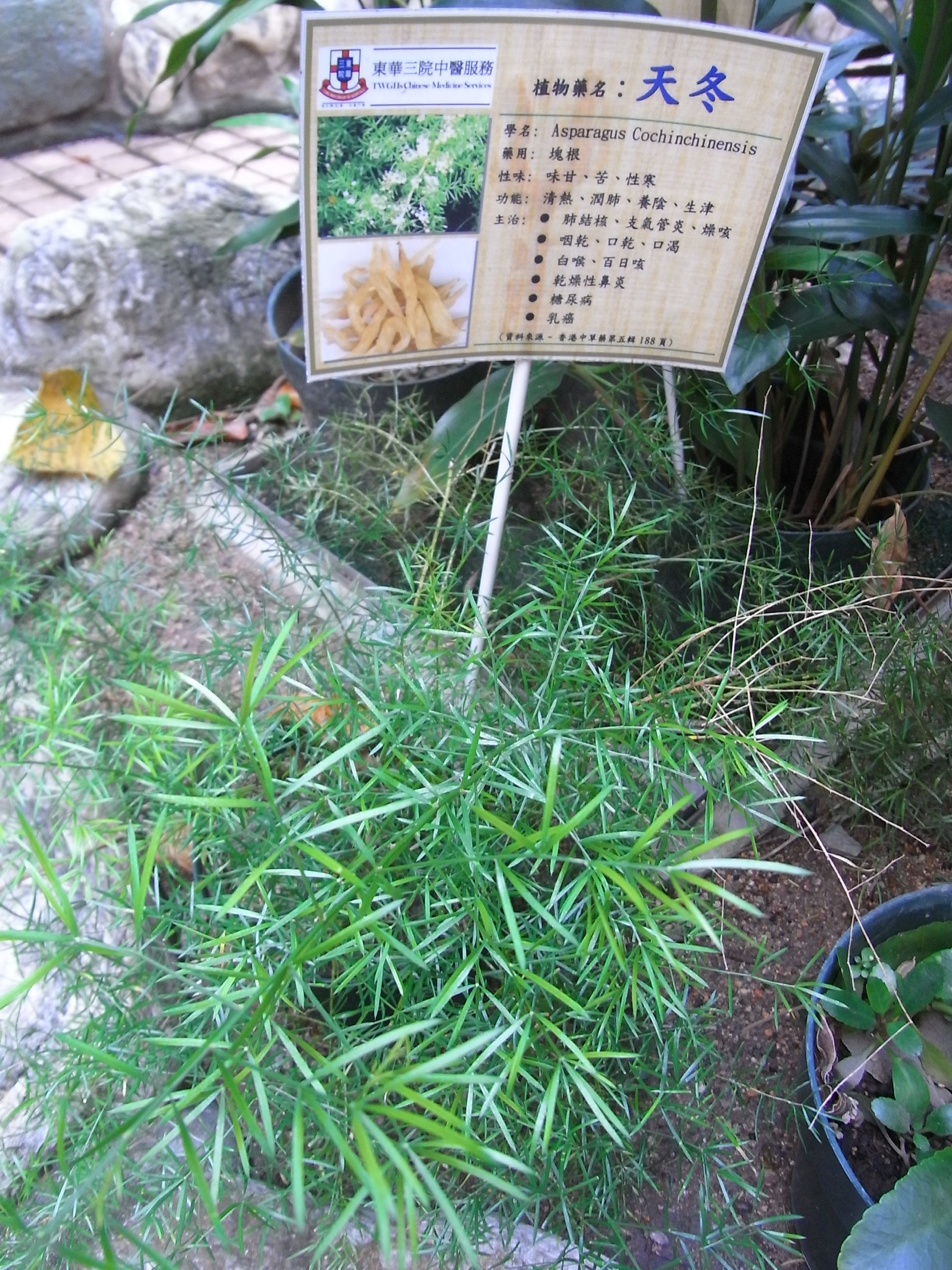
