= Asparagus curillus =

Scientific classification
- Kingdom: Plantae
- Clade: Tracheophytes
- Clade: Angiosperms
- Clade: Monocots
- Order: Asparagales
- Family: Asparagaceae
- Subfamily: Asparagoideae
- Genus: Asparagus
- Species: A. curillus

Binomial name
- Asparagus curillus Buch.-Ham. ex Roxb

Species of flowering plant

Asparagus curillus is a shrub distributed in the tropical and temperate climate (1000 – 2250 meter altitude) of the central Himalaya. It is known as shatawar in traditional Ayurvedic medicine in which it is used as a demulcent, an herbal tonic, to terminate pregnancies, and to treat gonorrhea and diabetes. This plant contains oligospirostanosides, oligofurostanosides, sarsasapogenin glycoside, steroidal saponins, and steroidal glycosides.

== Vernacular Names ==
Asparagus curillus is known by various local names across India. In Hindi, it is called “Satavari” or “Safed Musli”, while in Marathi, it is referred to as “Shatavari”. In Bengali, it may be called “Shatamuli”, and in Sanskrit, it is traditionally known as “Shatavari”, meaning "curer of a hundred diseases".
