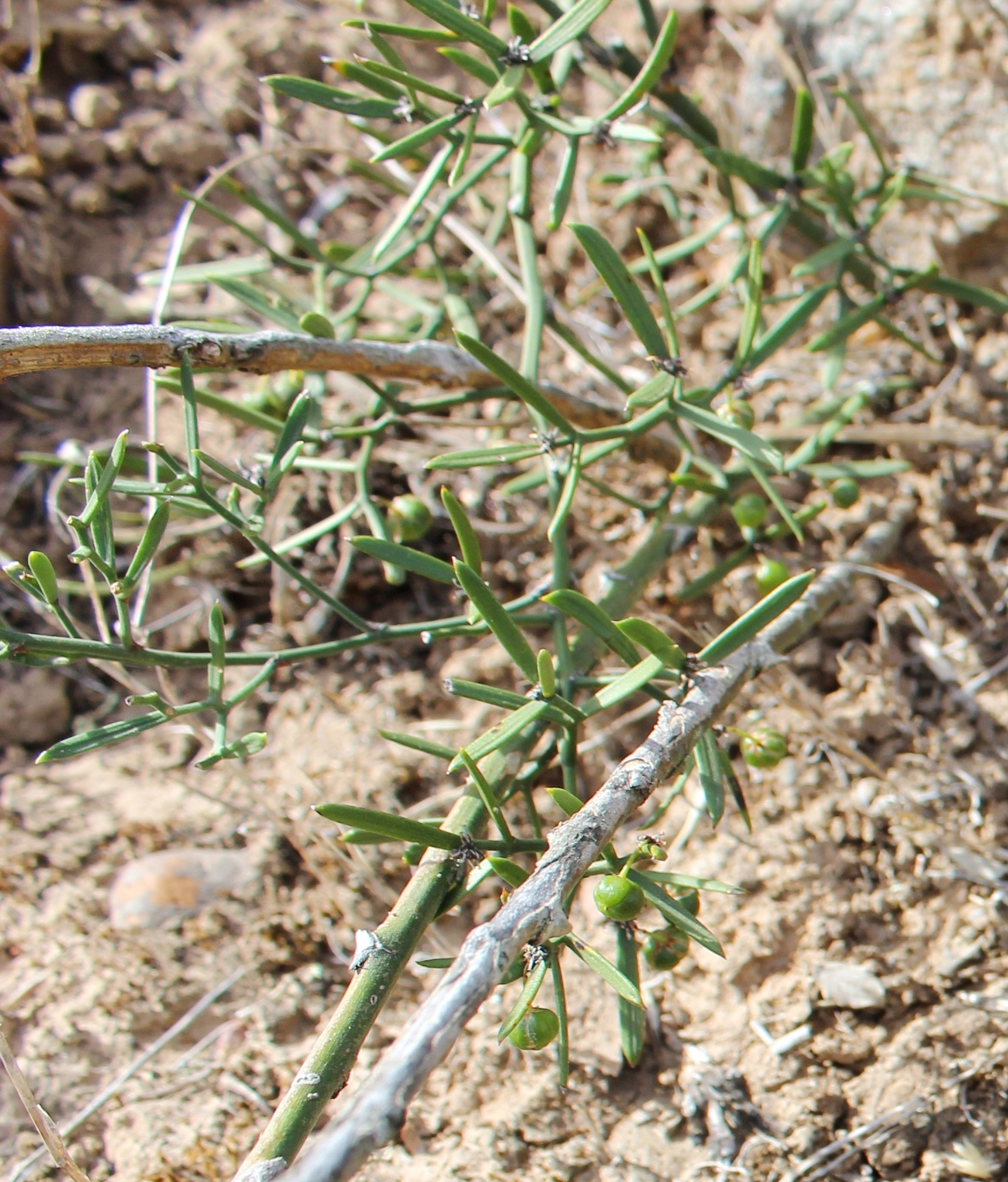
- The hard, green foliage of Asparagus striatus

Scientific classification
- Kingdom: Plantae
- Clade: Tracheophytes
- Clade: Angiosperms
- Clade: Monocots
- Order: Asparagales
- Family: Asparagaceae
- Subfamily: Asparagoideae
- Genus: Asparagus
- Species: A. striatus

Binomial name
- Asparagus striatus (L.f.) Thunb.

= Asparagus striatus =

Species of shrub

Asparagus striatus ("Bergappel") is a hard perennial shrublet of the Asparagus genus, that is indigenous to dry, rocky areas of South Africa.

== Description ==
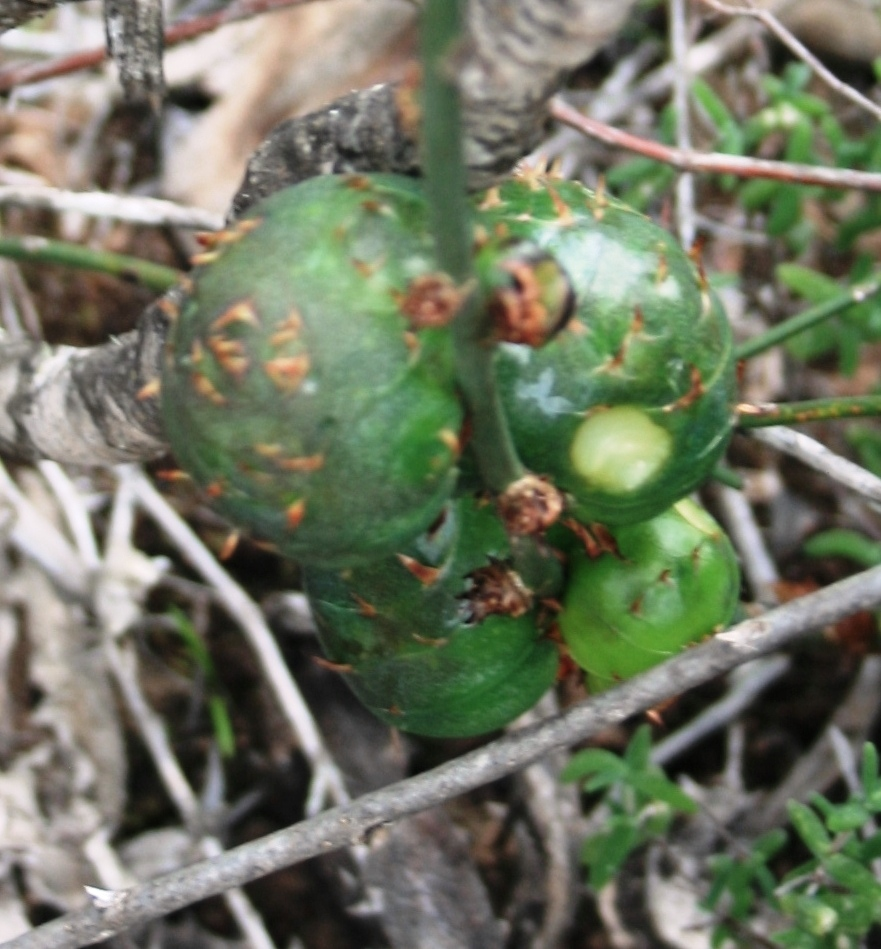
Galls on the stems of Asparagus striatus, from near Heidelberg, Western Cape.

A tough, perennial shrub reaching 60 cm in height. Unlike many of its relatives, it has no spines.

Its stems are hard and green. The leaves are held individually (not in groups or tufts). They are slender (c.35mm x 2-5mm), hard, green and the leaf-tips are sharp.

It often forms rounded gray-green galls on its stem, the result of parasitism by the fly Asparagobius braunsi.

The fragrant white flowers appear after rain, while the fruits are small berries (5mm wide) that become reddish orange when ripe.

== Distribution ==
This species is endemic to South Africa. Its distribution is from Bredasdorp and the Overberg in the south, as far as the Eastern Cape Province and Free State.

Its natural habitat is rocky shale, clay-rich soils, in succulent karoo or renosterveld vegetation.
