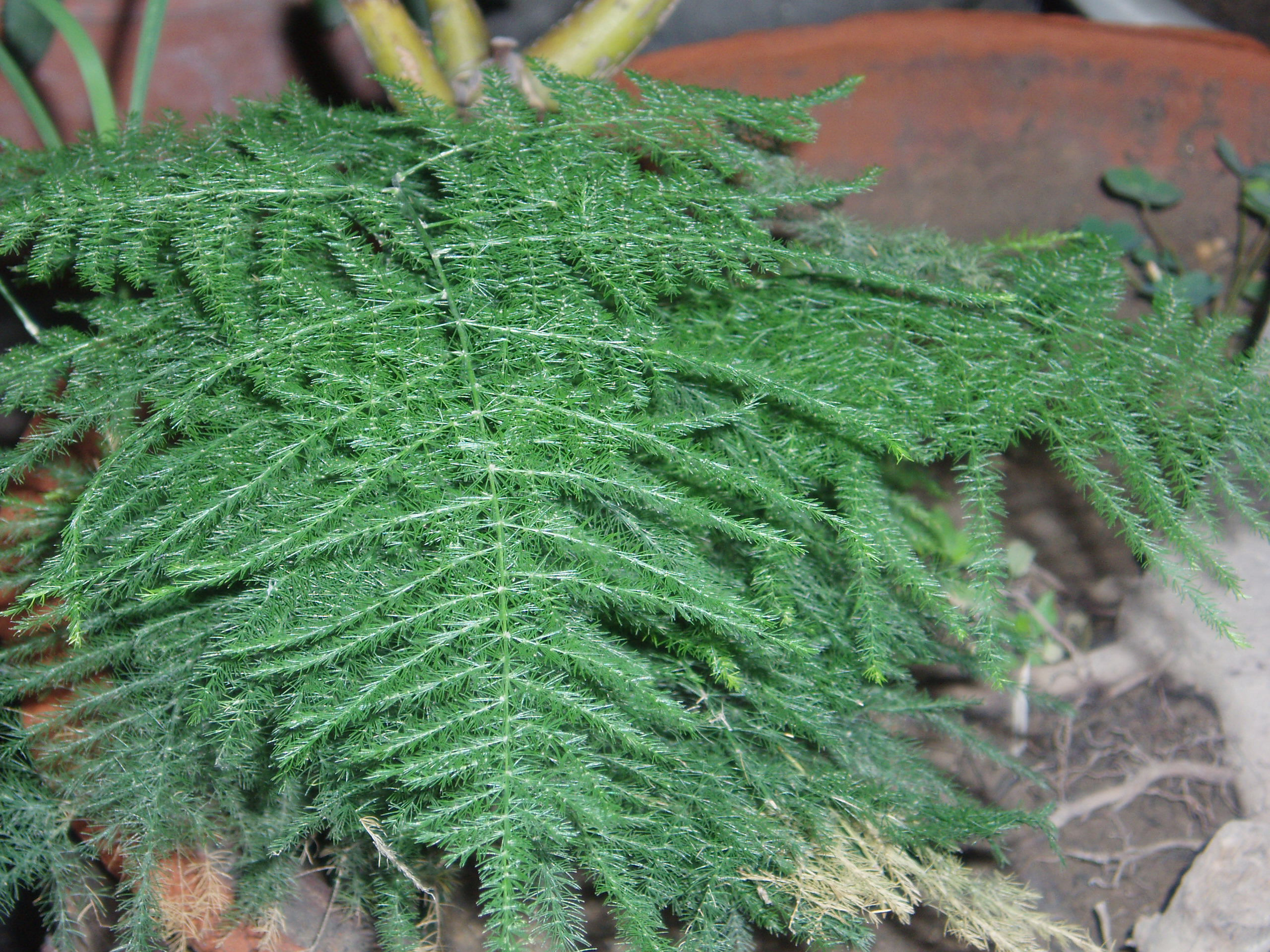
- Asparagus setaceus
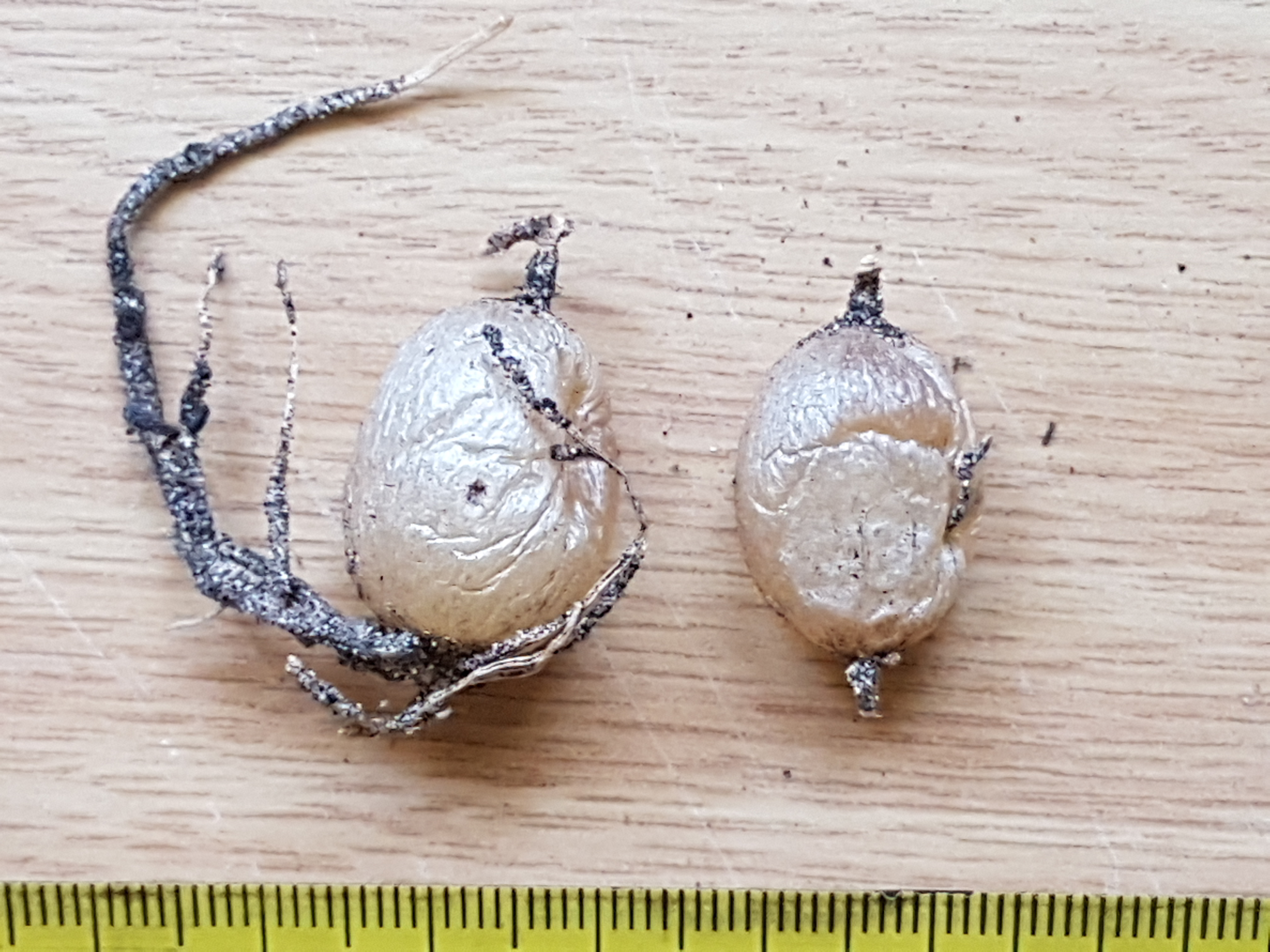
- Asparagus tubers

Scientific classification
- Kingdom: Plantae
- Clade: Embryophytes
- Clade: Tracheophytes
- Clade: Spermatophytes
- Clade: Angiosperms
- Clade: Monocots
- Order: Asparagales
- Family: Asparagaceae
- Subfamily: Asparagoideae
- Genus: Asparagus; L.

Type species
- Asparagus officinalis

Synonyms
- Elid Medik.; Myrsiphyllum Willd.; Asparagopsis (Kunth) Kunth; Hecatris Salisb.; Elachanthera F.Muell.; Protasparagus Oberm.

= Asparagus (genus) =

Genus of flowering plants

Asparagus is a genus of flowering plants in the family Asparagaceae, subfamily Asparagoideae. It comprises up to 300 species. Most are evergreen long-lived perennial plants growing from the understory as lianas, bushes or climbing plants. The best-known species is the edible Asparagus officinalis, commonly referred to as just asparagus. Some other members of the genus, such as Asparagus densiflorus, are grown as ornamental plants.

== Ecology ==
The genus includes a variety of extant forms, occurring from rainforest to semi-desert habitats; many are climbing plants. Most are dispersed by birds.

Ornamental species such as Asparagus aethiopicus, Asparagus setaceus (syn. Asparagus plumosus), and Asparagus virgatus are finely branched and are misleadingly known as "asparagus fern".

In the Macaronesian Islands, several species (such as Asparagus umbellatus and Asparagus scoparius) grow in moist laurel forest habitat, and preserve the original form of a leafy vine. In the drier Mediterranean climate the asparagus genus evolved in the Tertiary into thorny, drought-adapted species. Root tubers are storage organs developed by Asparagus species and are a valuable source of moisture and nutrition for species growing under drought conditions.

Approximately 27% of Asparagus species are dioecious and genomic and biogeographic analysis of the genus supports two independent clade-specific transitions from hermaphroditism to dioecy; both events occurred between three and four million years ago in Eurasia and the Mediterranean Basin.

Many species, particularly from Africa, were once included in separate genera such as Protasparagus and Myrsiphyllum. However, partly in response to the implications of the discovery of new species, those genera have been reunited under Asparagus. Species in this genus vary in their appearance, from unarmed herbs to wiry, woody climbers with formidable hooked spines that earn them vernacular names such as "cat thorn" and "wag 'n bietjie" (literally "wait a bit"). Most species have photosynthetic flattened stems, called phylloclades, instead of true leaves. Asparagus officinalis, Asparagus schoberioides, and Asparagus cochinchinensis are dioecious species, with male and female flowers on separate plants.

== Selected species ==
As of September 2014, the World Checklist of Selected Plant Families accepts 212 species of Asparagus, including:

- Asparagus acutifolius – wild asparagus
- Asparagus aethiopicus (= Asparagus sprengeri, Protasparagus aethiopicus) – ground asparagus, asparagus fern, (S. Afr.) emerald fern, basket asparagus
  - Asparagus aethiopicus 'Sprengeri' – Sprenger's asparagus
- Asparagus africanus (= Protasparagus africanus) – African asparagus
- Asparagus asparagoides ( = Myrsiphyllum asparagoides) – smilax, African asparagus fern, (Austr.) bridal creeper
- Asparagus burchellii – southern Cape, South Africa
- Asparagus cochinchinensis – Tian men dong (天門冬) in Chinese. The roots and stems are used in traditional Chinese and Korean medicine.
- Asparagus declinatus – foxtail asparagus fern, (Austr.) bridal veil
- Asparagus capensis
- Asparagus curillus – Himalayas
- Asparagus densiflorus (= Protasparagus densiflorus)
- Asparagus exuvialis – southern Cape, South Africa
- Asparagus falcatus – large forest sicklethorn of southern Africa
- Asparagus fallax – esparraguera de monteverde. Macaronesian native flora.
- Asparagus flagellaris
- Asparagus horridus – Mediterranean, Arabian Peninsula, Macaronesia.
- Asparagus krebsianus – southern Cape, South Africa
- Asparagus laricinus – katbos
- Asparagus lignosus
- Asparagus macowanii (= Protasparagus macowanii)
- Asparagus mariae – southern Cape, South Africa
- Asparagus maritimus
- Asparagus mucronatus – southern Cape, South Africa
- Asparagus multiflorus – southern Cape, South Africa
- Asparagus nesiotes – esparraguera majorera. Macaronesian native flora.
- Asparagus officinalis – asparagus
  - Asparagus officinalis subsp. officinalis – garden asparagus
  - Asparagus officinalis subsp. prostratus
- Asparagus ovatus – southern Cape, South Africa
- Asparagus pastorianus – esparraguera espinablanca. Macaronesian native flora.
- Asparagus persicus
- Asparagus racemosus – Shatavari in Hindi. The roots are used in Ayurvedic Medicine.
- Asparagus retrofractus
- Asparagus rubicundus
- Asparagus scandens – krulkransie of the Western Cape, South Africa
- Asparagus schoberioides
- Asparagus scoparius – esparragón raboburro. Macaronesian native flora.
- Asparagus setaceus (= Protasparagus setaceus, A. plumosus) – lace fern, asparagus fern, florist's fern, (Austr.) climbing asparagus
- Asparagus striatus – bergappel of the Western Cape to Free State, South Africa
- Asparagus suaveolens
- Asparagus tenuifolius
- Asparagus umbellatus – esparraguera común. Macaronesian native flora.
- Asparagus vaginellatus Bojer ex Baker
- Asparagus virgatus

== Pests and diseases ==
- Asparagus beetle (Crioceris asparagi)
- Spotted asparagus beetle (Crioceris duodecimpunctata)
- Asparagus miner (Ophiomyia simplex), a leaf-mining fly
- Asparagus fern caterpillar, also known as beet armyworm (Spodoptera exigua).
- Asparagus fly (Platyparaea poeciloptera), a fruit fly
- Fusarium root and crown rot, caused by two species of fungi, Fusarium monoliforme and Fusarium oxysporium asparagi
- Asparagus rust, caused by the fungus Puccinia asparagi
- Botrytis blight, caused by the fungus Botrytis cinerea
- The larvae of some Lepidoptera species have been recorded feeding on Asparagus. These include Coleophora lineapulvella, ghost moth, the nutmeg, small fan-footed wave, and turnip moth

== Invasive species ==
A. asparagoides, known as bridal creeper, is a problematic weed in southern Australia.

Asparagus asparagoides, A. scandens and A. setaceus are considered potentially destructive in California, growing as the result of escaped seeds; all can still be purchased at major and local garden centers. All three have the ability to completely overtake other, unrelated plants in their immediate surroundings, often climbing up the larger ones and strangling them, eventually cutting off the plant's flow of energy and nutrients. Birds are attracted to the red berries after blooming, thus transporting their seeds.

Asparagus asparagoides, A. aethiopicus (under the name A. densiflorus) and A. scandens are listed on the New Zealand National Pest Plant Accord since they are invasive plants.

A. setaceus is officially recognized as an invasive species in Rio Grande do Sul State, Brazil.

== Gallery ==
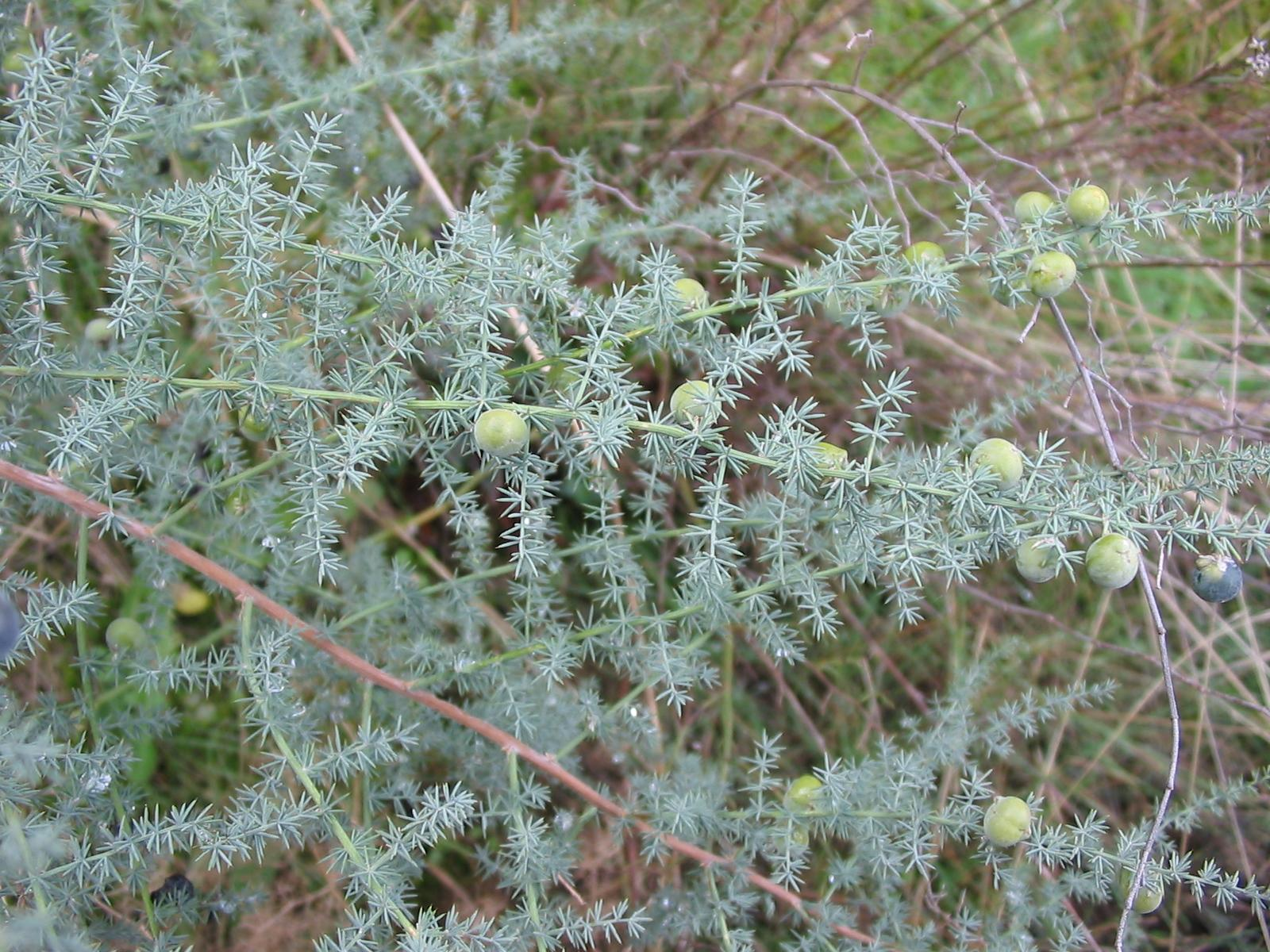
Asparagus acutifolius

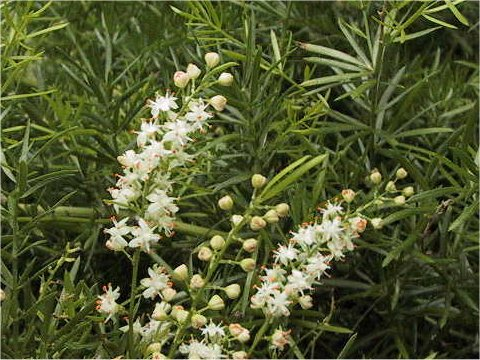
Asparagus aethiopicus

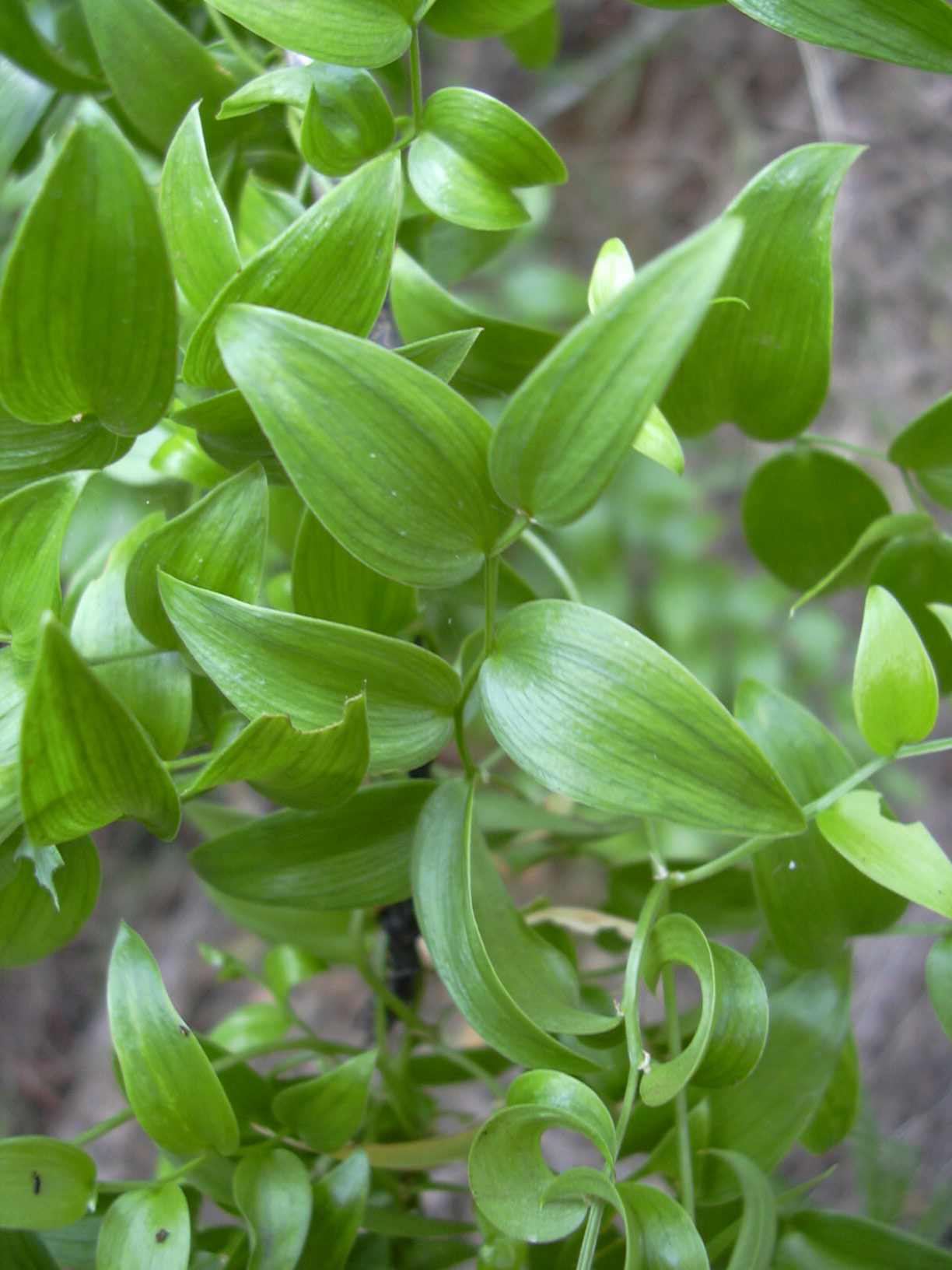
Asparagus asparagoides

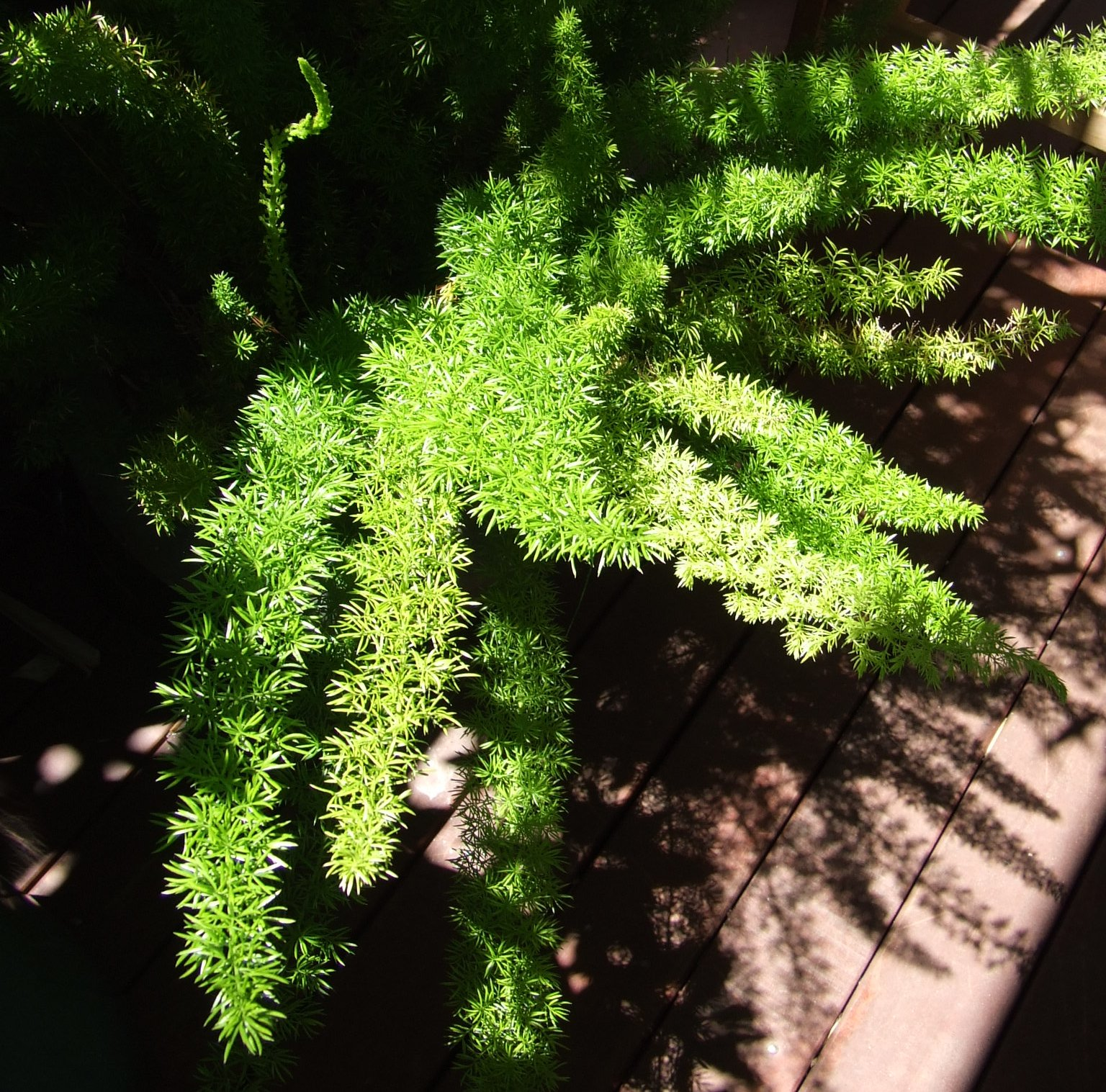
Asparagus densiflorus

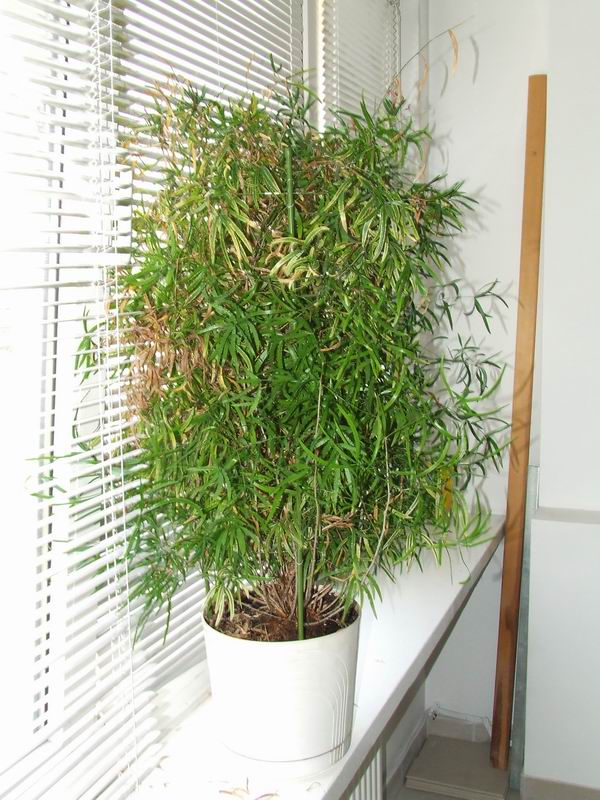
Asparagus falcatus

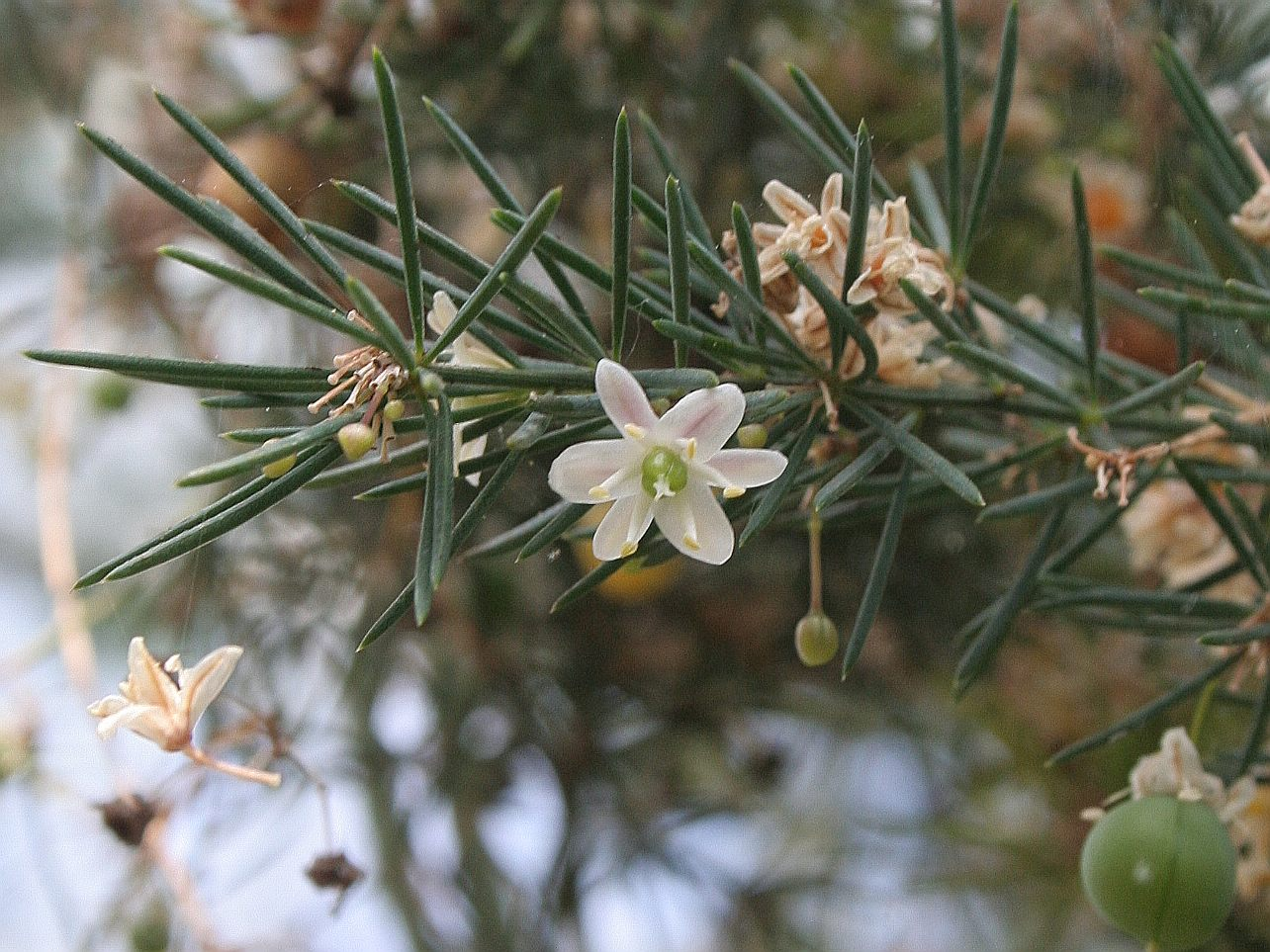
Asparagus fallax

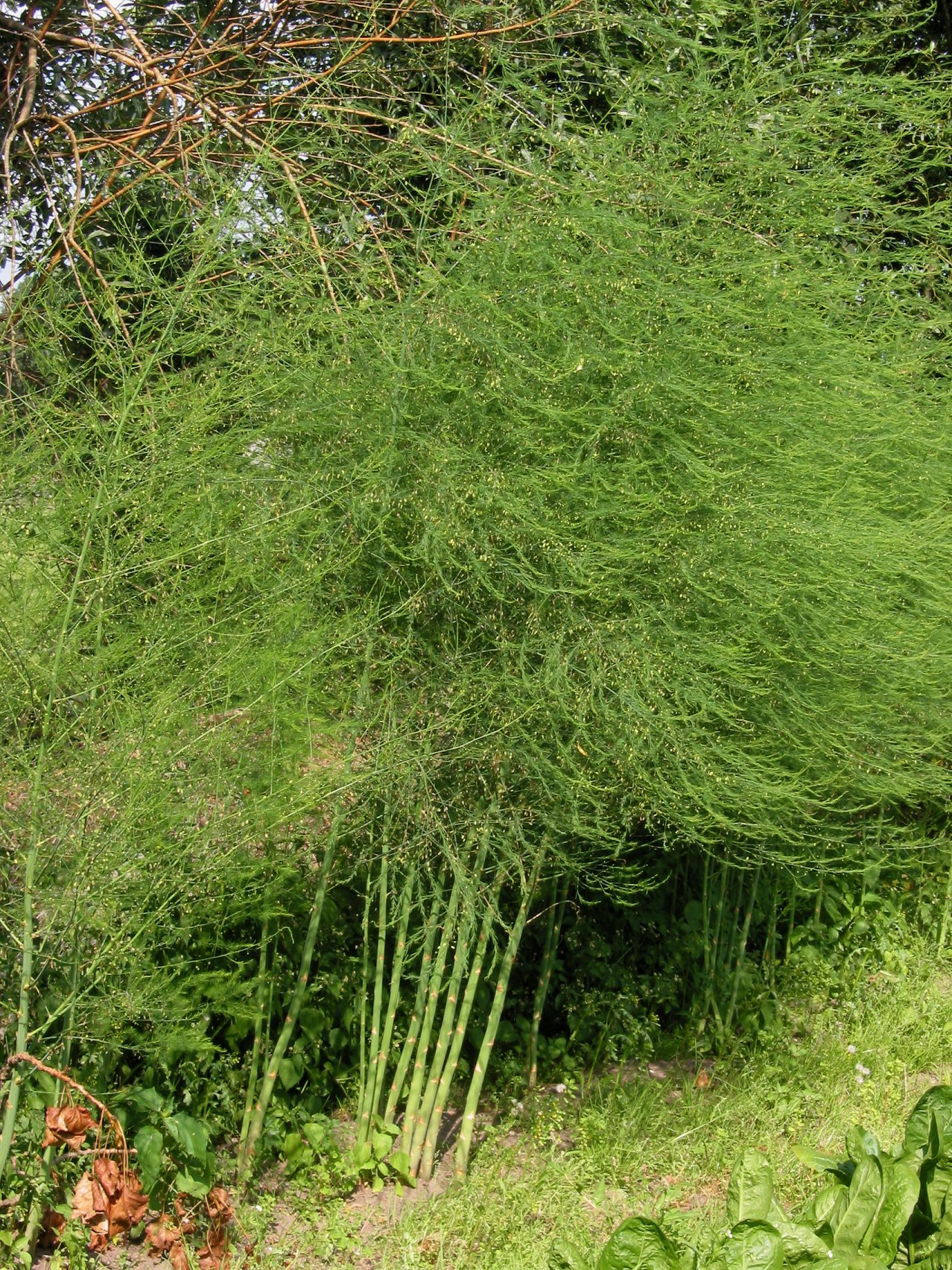
Asparagus officinalis

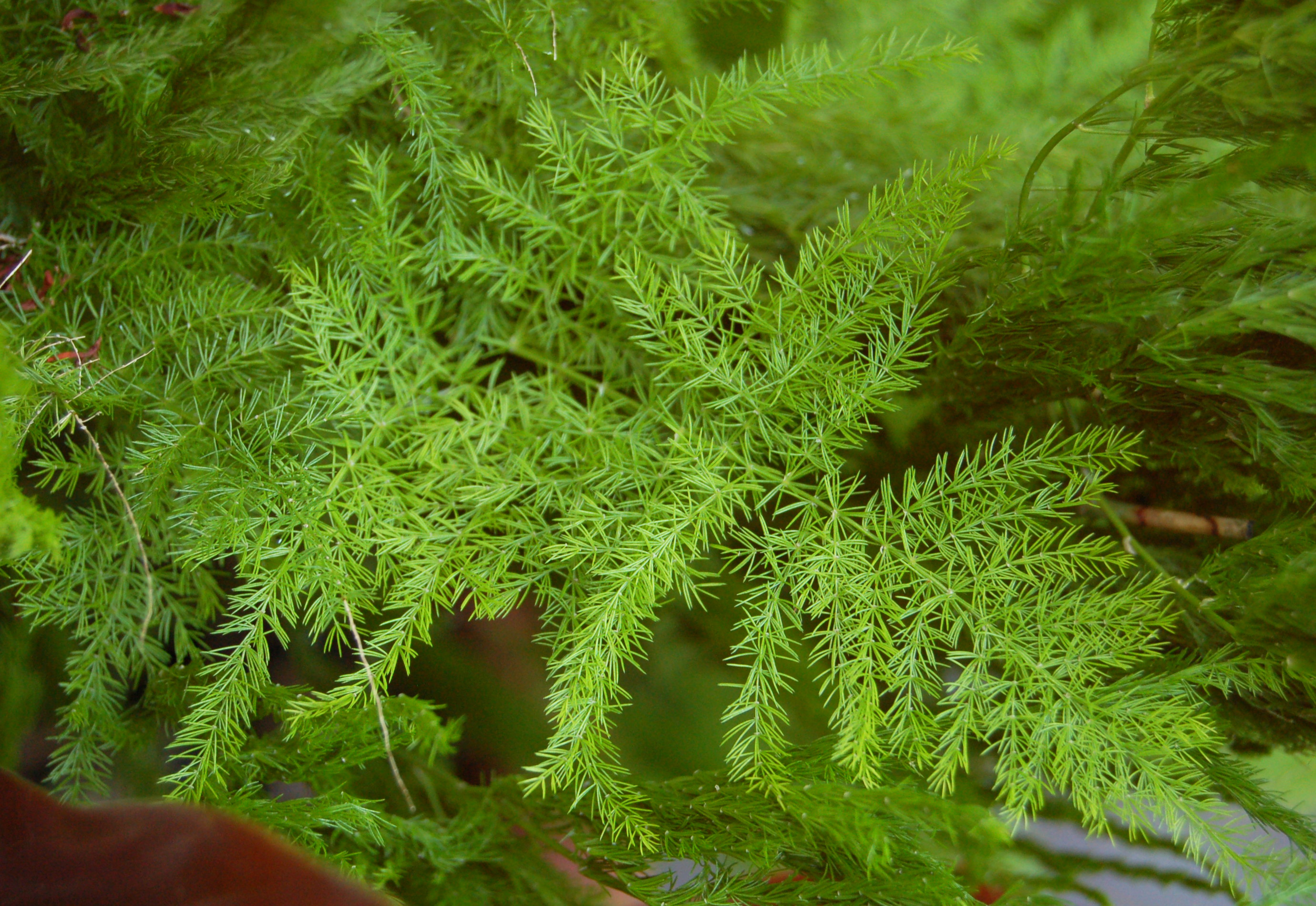
Asparagus setaceus

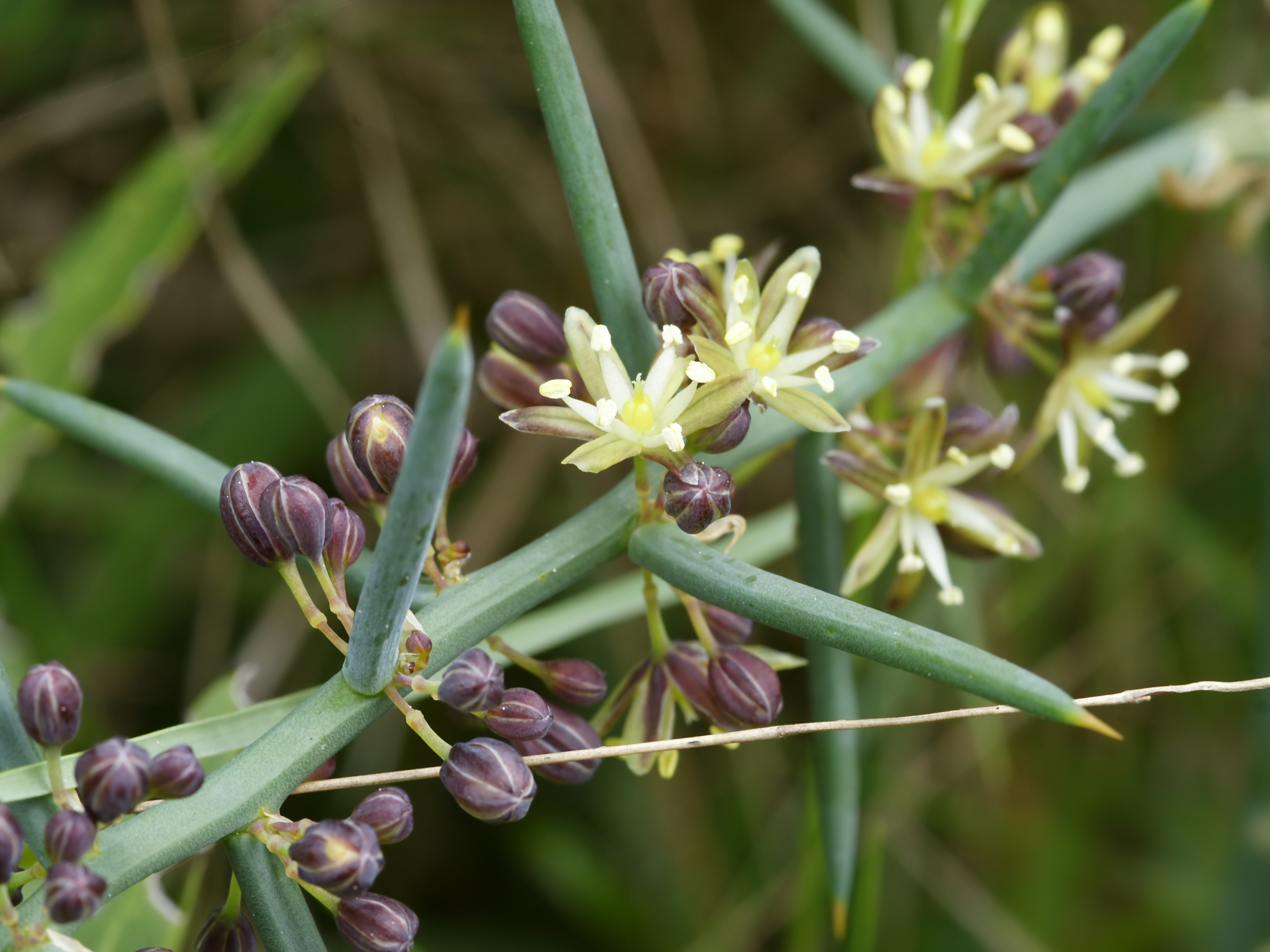
Asparagus stipularis

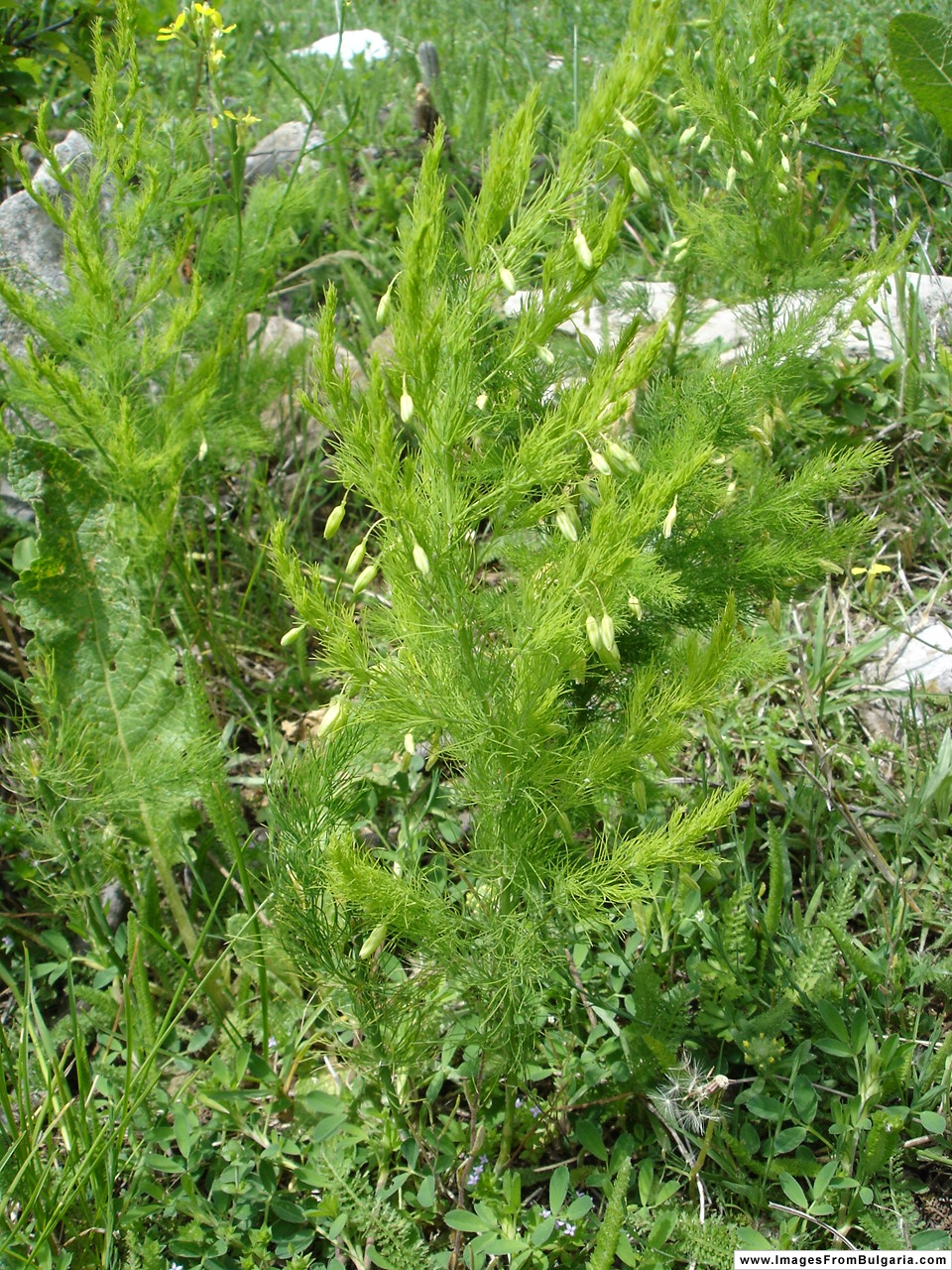
Asparagus tenuifolius

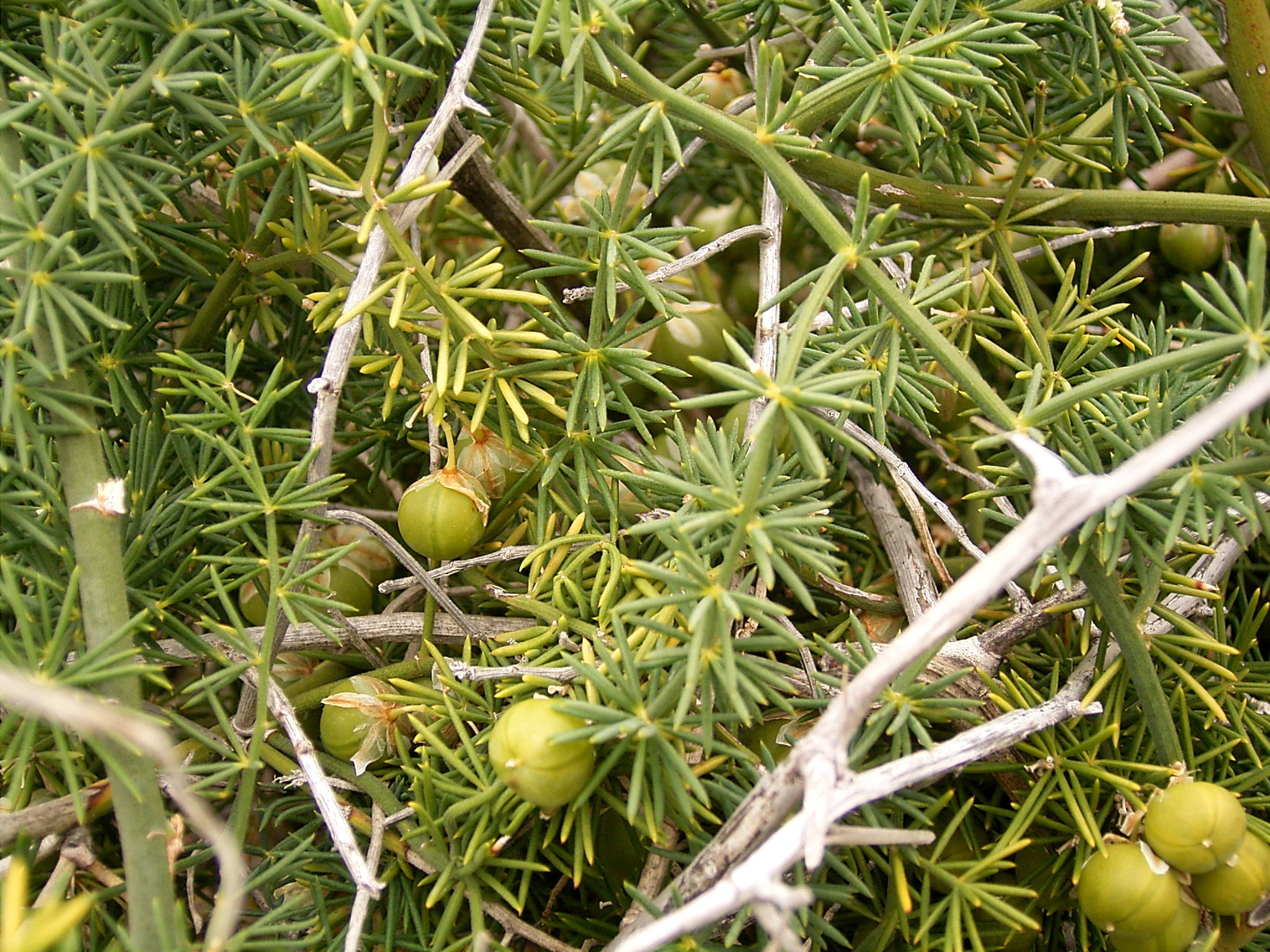
Asparagus umbellatus

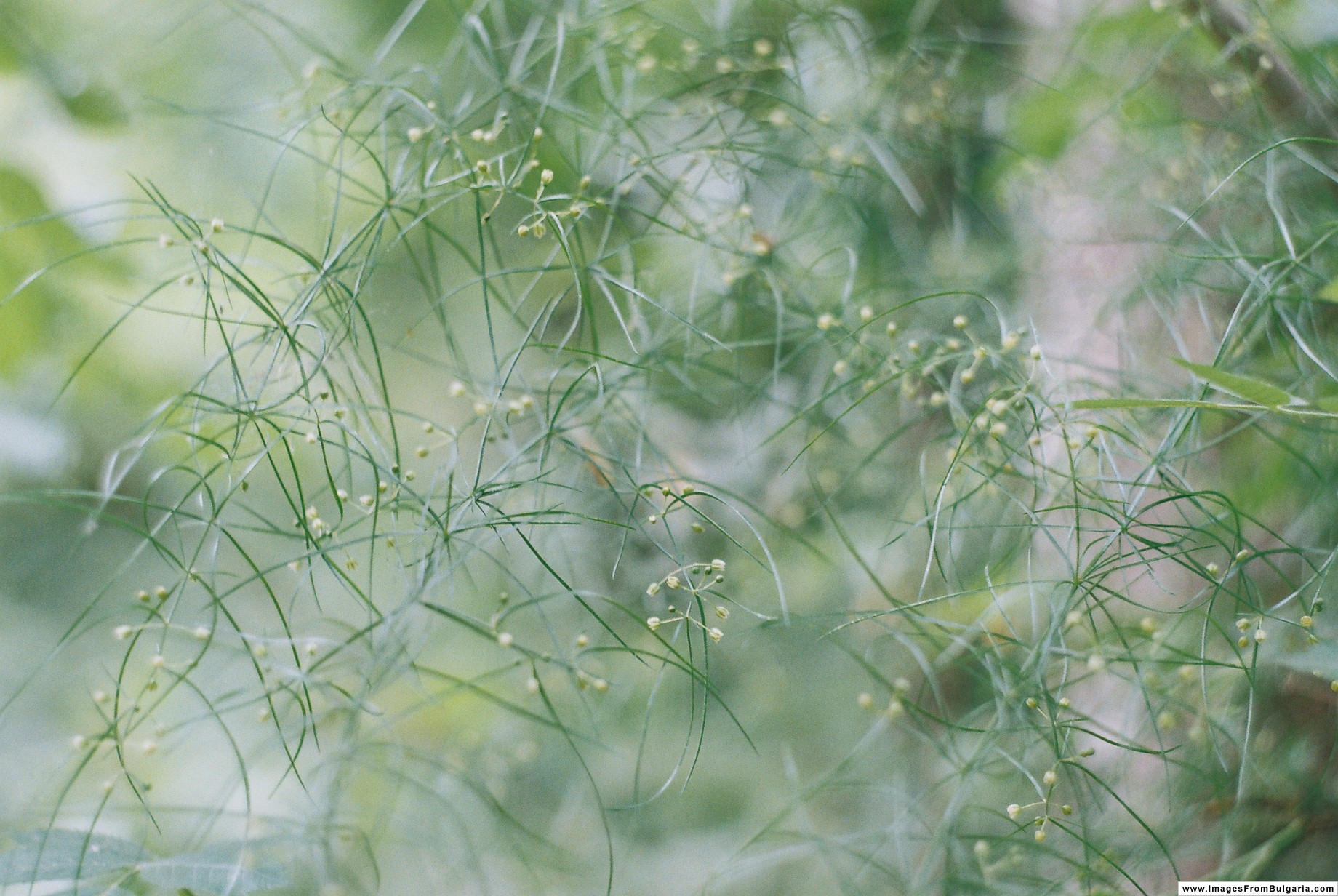
Asparagus verticillatus

== Bibliography ==
- Fellingham, A.C. & Meyer, N.L. (1995) "New combinations and a complete list of Asparagus species in southern Africa (Asparagaceae)". Bothalia 25: 205–209.
