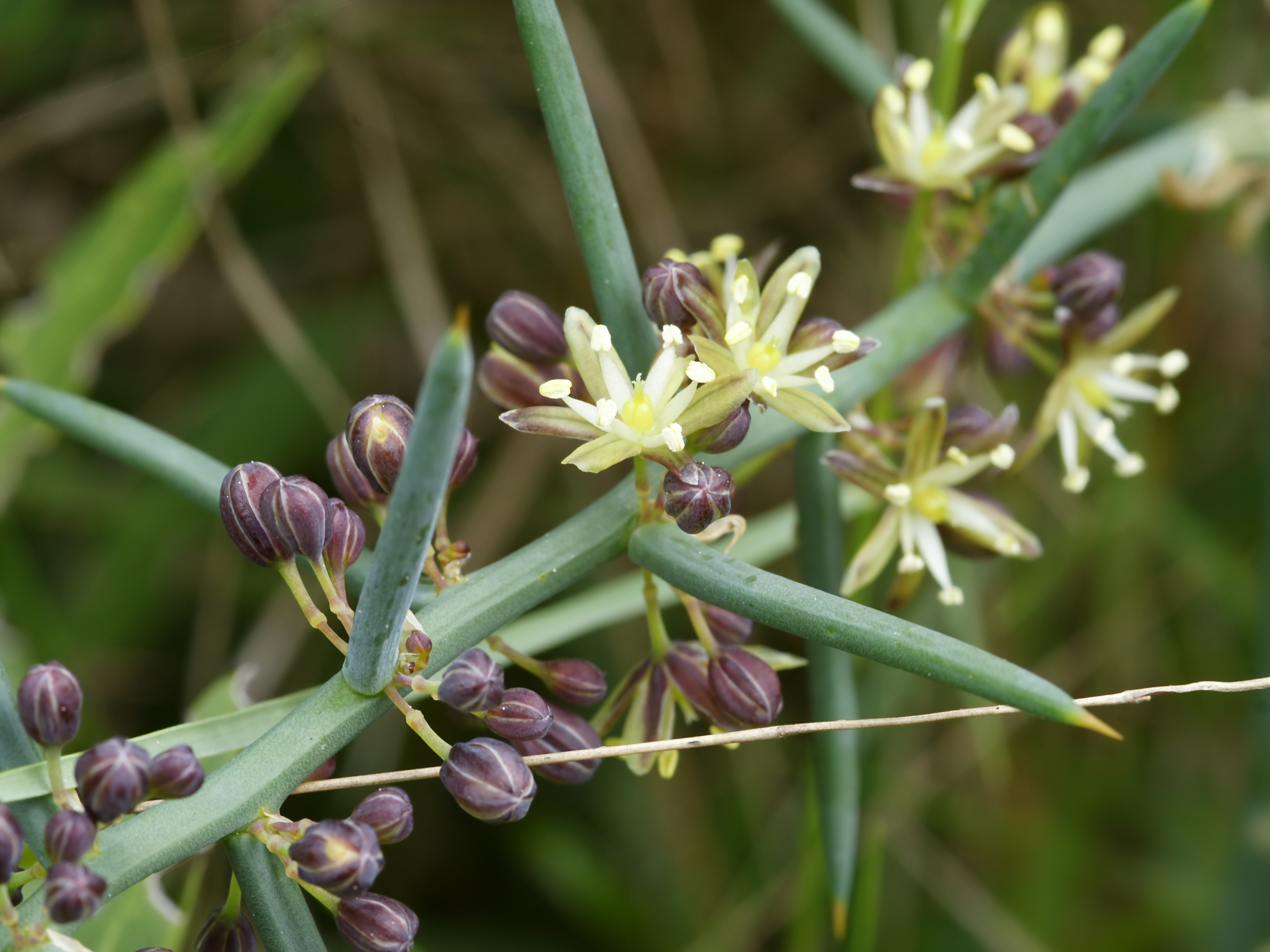

Scientific classification
- Kingdom: Plantae
- Clade: Embryophytes
- Clade: Tracheophytes
- Clade: Angiosperms
- Clade: Monocots
- Order: Asparagales
- Family: Asparagaceae
- Subfamily: Asparagoideae
- Genus: Asparagus
- Species: A. horridus

Binomial name
- Asparagus horridus L.
- Distribution; Native range

Synonyms
- Asparagus stipularis

= Asparagus horridus =

Species of plant

Asparagus horridus is a species of shrub in the family Asparagaceae. They are climbing plants. They have simple, broad leaves and fleshy fruit. Individuals can grow to 1 m (3.3 ft) tall.

The species is native to Algeria, Balearic Islands, Canary Islands, Cyprus, Egypt (including Sinai), Greece (including Crete and East Aegean Islands), Gulf States, Italy (including Sardegna and Sicilia), Lebanon, Libya, Morocco, Palestine, Saudi Arabia, Spain, Syria and Tunisia.

== Sources ==
- This article incorporates text from a free content work. Licensed under CC0 (license statement/permission). Text taken from Asparagus stipularis. Encyclopedia of Life.
- This article incorporates text from a free content work. Licensed under Commons Attribution Licence (CC-BY) (license statement/permission). Text taken from Asparagus horridus L.. Plants of the World Online.
