= Asparagus flagellaris =

Scientific classification
- Kingdom: Plantae
- Clade: Tracheophytes
- Clade: Angiosperms
- Clade: Monocots
- Order: Asparagales
- Family: Asparagaceae
- Subfamily: Asparagoideae
- Genus: Asparagus
- Species: A. flagellaris

Binomial name
- Asparagus flagellaris (Kunth) Baker

Synonyms
- Asparagopsis flagellaris Kunth; Asparagus abyssinicus Hochst. ex A.Rich. Asparagus pauli-guilelmi Solms; Asparagus schweinfurthii Baker; Asparagus somalensis Chiov.

Species of plant

Asparagus flagellaris is a flowering plant that is native to tropical Africa.

Like related species, the shoot-tips are eaten as a vegetable. The fruit — juicy orange berries with a sweet taste — are also eaten.
