= Asparagus persicus =

Scientific classification
- Kingdom: Plantae
- Clade: Tracheophytes
- Clade: Angiosperms
- Clade: Monocots
- Order: Asparagales
- Family: Asparagaceae
- Subfamily: Asparagoideae
- Genus: Asparagus
- Species: A. persicus

Binomial name
- Asparagus persicus Baker, 1875

Synonyms
- Asparagus leptophyllus Schischk. Asparagus oligophyllus Baker

Species of plant

Asparagus persicus, is a flowering plant in the Asparagaceae family. It grows between 800–1700 and is native to Turkey, Iran, Afghanistan, Uzbekistan, Tajikistan, Kazakhstan, China, Russia. It is perennial herbaceous halophyte plant up to 1.5 m tall. It is dioecious, with male and female flowers on separate plants.
