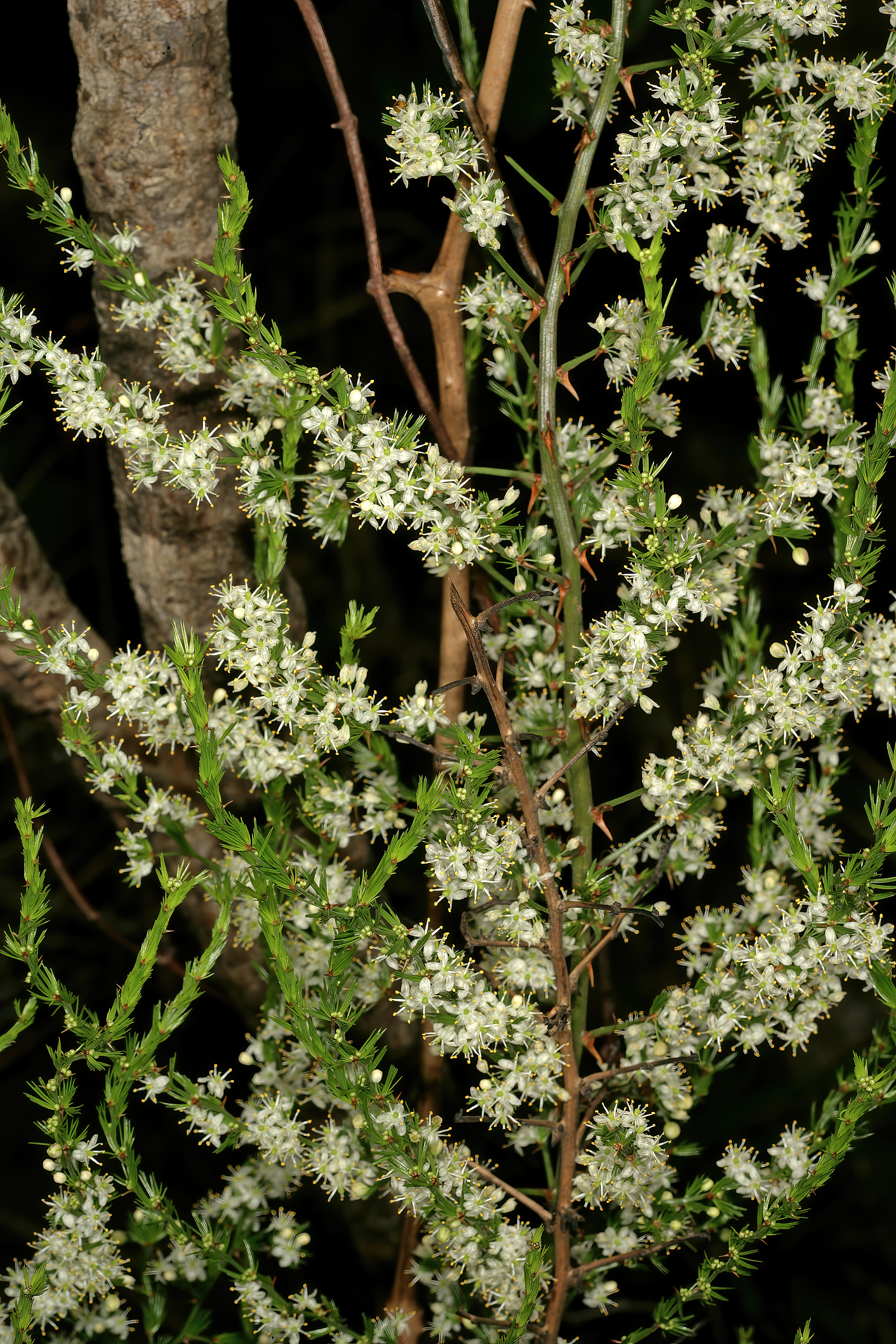

Scientific classification
- Kingdom: Plantae
- Clade: Tracheophytes
- Clade: Angiosperms
- Clade: Monocots
- Order: Asparagales
- Family: Asparagaceae
- Subfamily: Asparagoideae
- Genus: Asparagus
- Species: A. africanus

Binomial name
- Asparagus africanus Lam.

Synonyms
- Asparagopsis lamarckii Kunth; Asparagus gourmacus A.Chev. ex Hutch. & Dalziel; Protasparagus africanus (Lam.) Oberm.

= Asparagus africanus =

African asparagus

Species of plant

Asparagus africanus, also known as African asparagus, bush asparagus, wild asparagus, climbing asparagus fern, ornamental asparagus and sparrow grass, is an African species of plant that is found in a variety of habitats. It has multiple medicinal properties and is used to treat various ailments.

== Description ==
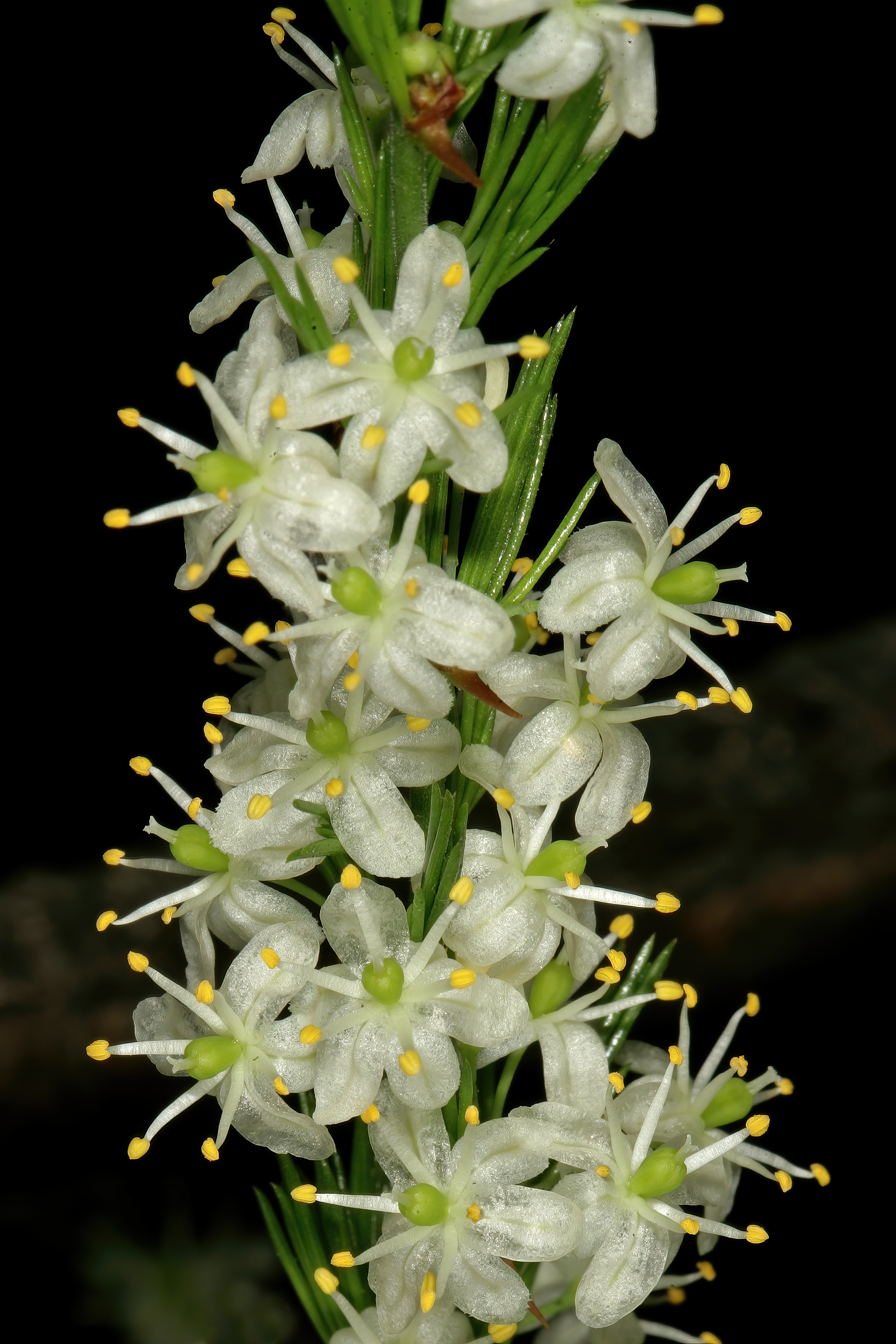
The flowers of Asparagus africanus

Asparagus africanus is a spiny shrub up to 1 m (3.3 ft) tall or a climbing plant with stems up to 3 m (9.8 ft) long. Stems of up to 12 m (39 ft) long have also been recorded. These plants have a rhizomatous root system, from which they can reshoot. Multiple stems grow from a central crown. Bunches of cladodes (modified branchlets) occur at the leaf scales. Each ends in a sharp point. These look fern-like, giving rise to one of this species' common names (climbing asparagus fern).

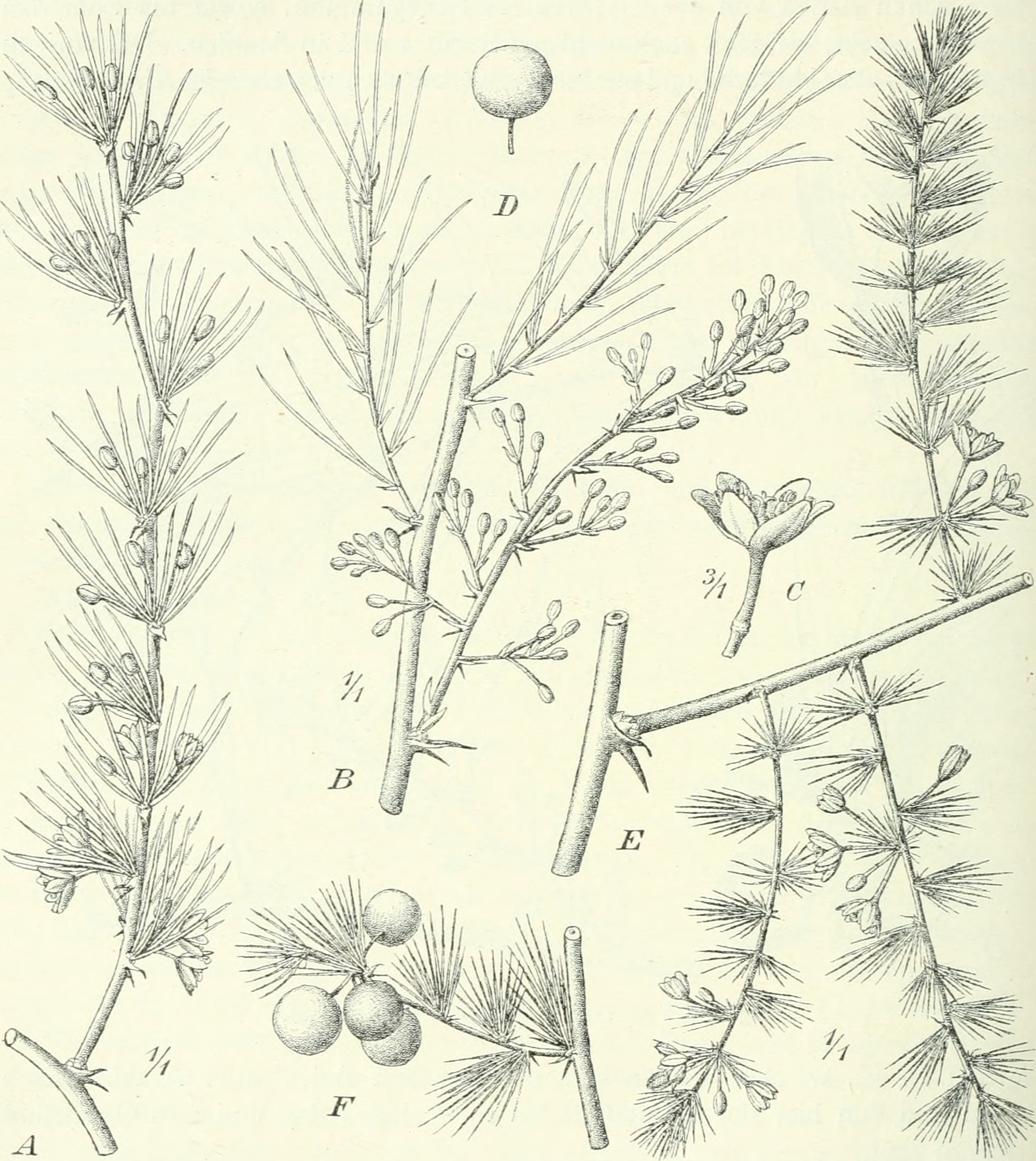
Diagnostic characters of Asparagus africanus illustrated in 1910.

The plant produces white flowers, which, like the leaves, grow in clusters. They have three sepals and three petals, which are similar in appearance. The six white filaments have yellow anthers. Flowers are present between August and December in the Southern Hemisphere. The colour and the scent of these flowers attract insects, which pollinate the flowers.

Plants produce round fruits. These are red when ripe and shrivel to reveal a single black seed. These fruits may also be eaten by mammals and birds, aiding in dispersal. Fruits may be present at any time of the year, assuming that conditions are suitable. These berries contain toxic compounds, such as furostanol and may cause pain and vomiting.

== Distribution and habitat ==
Asparagus africanus is a widely distributed species. It is found across most of Africa, as well as the Arabian Peninsula and India. It grows in a variety of habitats, ranging from rainforests to grasslands to semi-deserts. The plant can grow rapidly. In its climbing state it can quickly come to dominate the canopy, outcompeting other species. It has also become naturalised in parts of Australia after being introduced as an ornamental plant.

== Conservation ==
The population is considered to be stable and the species is listed as being of least concern by the South African National Biodiversity Institute (SANBI).

This species is considered to be a problematic weed in Queensland. For example, it is considered to threaten ecosystem functioning in the Boondall Wetlands Reserve. It is listed as a category 3 restricted matter under the 2014 Biosecurity Act, meaning that it can not be gifted, sold or released without a permit in an attempt to reduce its spread. As such, eradication programs are being established to remove it across its range in Australia.

== Uses ==
The new shoots are harvested and eaten as a vegetable. They are seen as being a good source of fiber and various vitamins. The roots are also boiled and eaten. The fruit are mainly only eaten during times of famine.

The stems and underground components of the plants are used to treat a wide variety of conditions in a variety of cultures. Research has found that they improve the functioning of the immune system in laboratory animals, providing insight as to why this plant is so widely utilised. It is, for example, seen as a valuable medicinal plant by people living in Ethiopia. The Zay people of Ethiopia use the cladodes on their skin to treat skin lesions. They also feed equines the roots and cladodes to treat geregelcha, a disease in which mucus continuously comes out of the nose of the animal. The root tubers mixed with milk are used after birth to help expel the afterbirth. It is also used as a form of birth control by rural women in Uganda. In South Africa, it is used to treat headaches, STIs, stomach aches, sore throats and malaria, amongst other conditions.

Compounds found in the roots have been found to be an effective anti-parasitic and anti-protozoan, including against Plasmodium falciparum, the most deadly form of malaria in humans. Methanolic extracts from the roots have also been found to have pain relief and anti-inflammatory properties.
