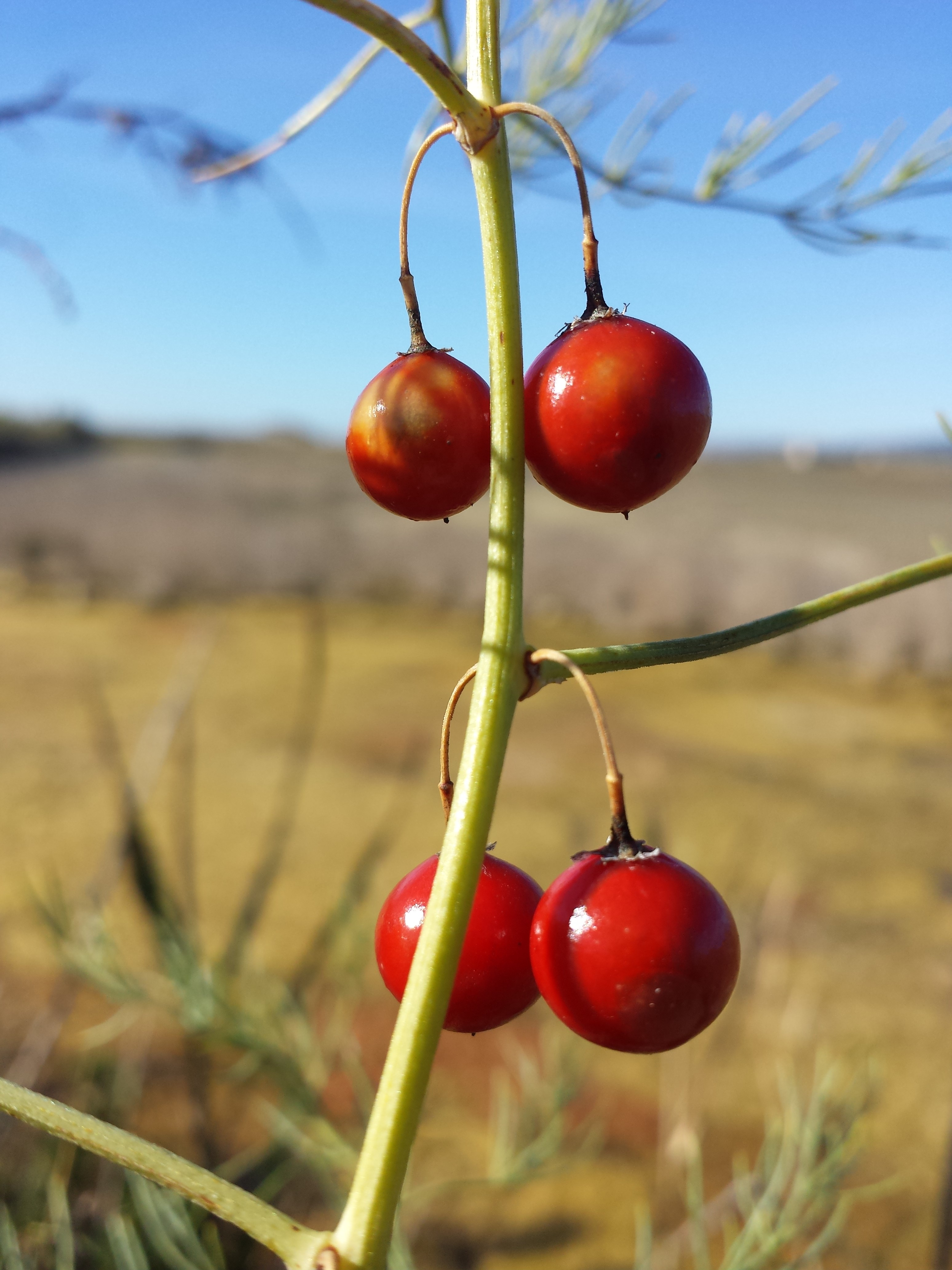

Scientific classification
- Kingdom: Plantae
- Clade: Tracheophytes
- Clade: Angiosperms
- Clade: Monocots
- Order: Asparagales
- Family: Asparagaceae
- Subfamily: Asparagoideae
- Genus: Asparagus
- Species: A. maritimus

Binomial name
- Asparagus maritimus (L.) Mill.

= Asparagus maritimus =

Species of flowering plant

Asparagus maritimus is a dense, thorny, shrub of the genus Asparagus that is indigenous to southern Europe and the Mediterranean. It is dioecious, with male and female flowers borne on separate plants.

Asparagus maritimus is an edible plant, the stem is the only edible part of the plant. It grows in sandy soil mainly by the coastal areas of the Mediterranean sea with well-drained soil, moist soil, and full sun. A. maritimus is currently threatened with extinction.
