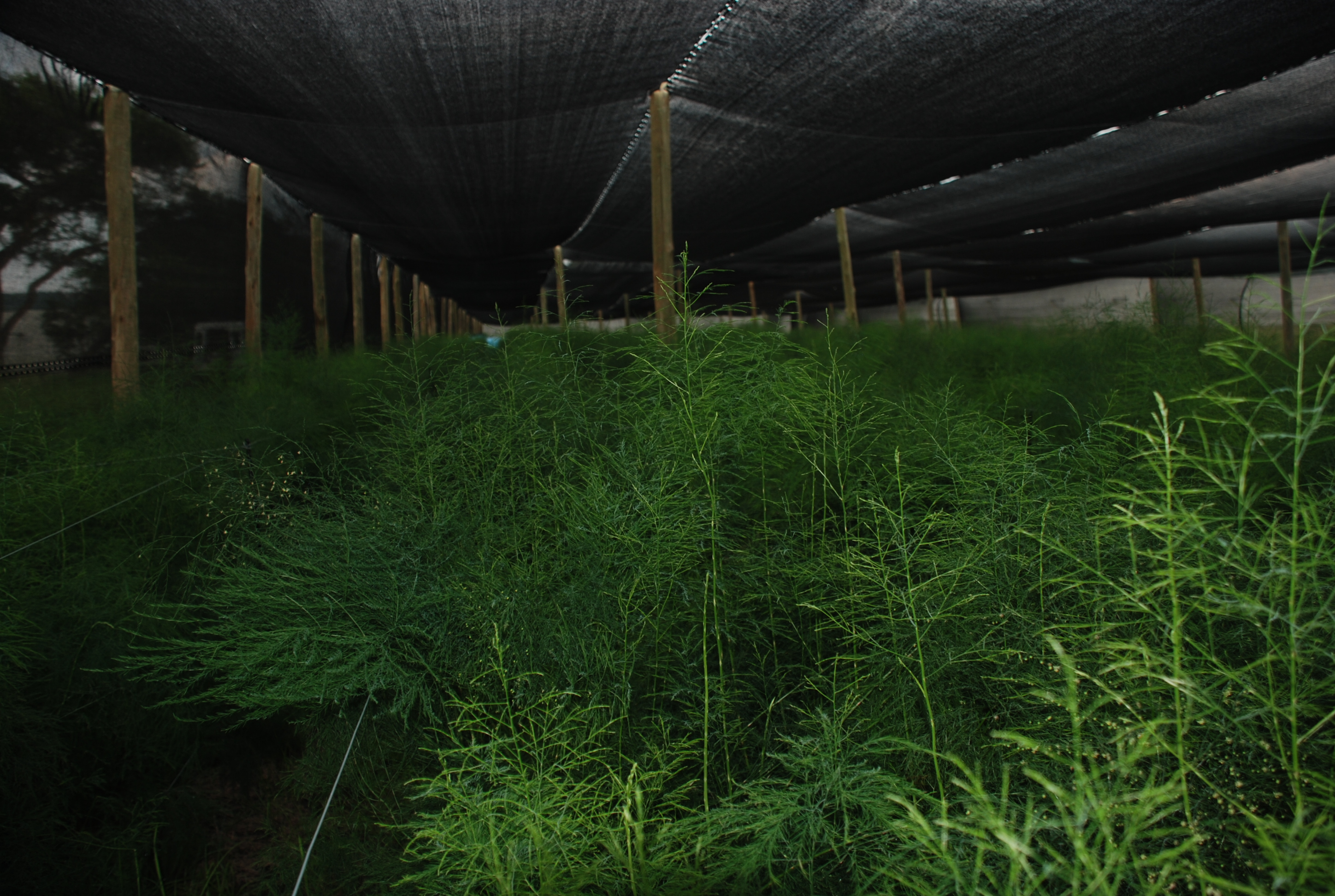
- Asparagus virgatus cultivation

Scientific classification
- Kingdom: Plantae
- Clade: Tracheophytes
- Clade: Angiosperms
- Clade: Monocots
- Order: Asparagales
- Family: Asparagaceae
- Subfamily: Asparagoideae
- Genus: Asparagus
- Species: A. virgatus

Binomial name
- Asparagus virgatus Baker

Synonyms
- Asparagus sylvaticus Burch. ex Baker; Protasparagus virgatus (Baker) Oberm.

= Asparagus virgatus =

Species of flowering plant

Asparagus virgatus is a species of flowering plant in the Asparagaceae family. It indigenous to South Eastern Africa. It is also known as tree fern, tiki fern, and African broom fern. Asparagus virgatus is a member of the genus Asparagus, and not a true fern.

== Description ==
The plant grows several fine bushy stems with needle like leaves, reaching over one meter in length. This perennial plant produces small white flowers during spring, and small spherical red fruits that then turn black as they mature.

This plant can be found growing in the shady undergrowth, especially along rivers. Although water loving, this plant is able to survive with little water.

== Uses ==
Unlike edible Asparagus officinalis, A. virgatus has little or no nutritional value to people.

=== Cut flower industry ===
A. virgatus is of commercial value, used world wide in the cut flower industry as foliage. The plant produces attractive green bushy stems with fine needle like leaves.

When combined with rose, gerbera, and other focal flowers it forms an attractive floral display. Vase life is typically two weeks. High quality stems can be identified by the fresh green color, and stem length.

Major producing areas include South Africa, Central America, Florida, Israel, and the Near East.
