= Coleophora lineapulvella =

Scientific classification
- Kingdom: Animalia
- Phylum: Arthropoda
- Clade: Pancrustacea
- Class: Insecta
- Order: Lepidoptera
- Family: Coleophoridae
- Genus: Coleophora
- Species: C. lineapulvella

Binomial name
- Coleophora lineapulvella Chambers, 1874

Synonyms
- Coleophora lapidicornis Walsingham, 1907; Coleophora amaranthella Braun, 1919

Species of moth

Coleophora lineapulvella is a moth of the family Coleophoridae. It is found in the United States, including Oklahoma, Ohio and Kentucky.

The larvae feed on the seeds of Amaranthus hybridus, Amaranthus retroflexus and possibly Prunus and Persica species. They create a trivalved, tubular silken case.
