= Eric Ragnor Sventenius =

Hispano-Swedish botanist (1910–1973)

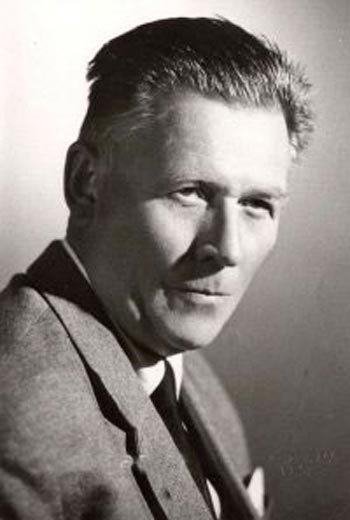
Sventenius unknown year.

Eric (Don Ericus) Ragnor Sventenius (born Erik Ragnar Svensson; also known simply as Eric (Erich, Enrico) Ragnor) (10 October 1910 — 23 June 1973) was a Hispano-Swedish botanist.

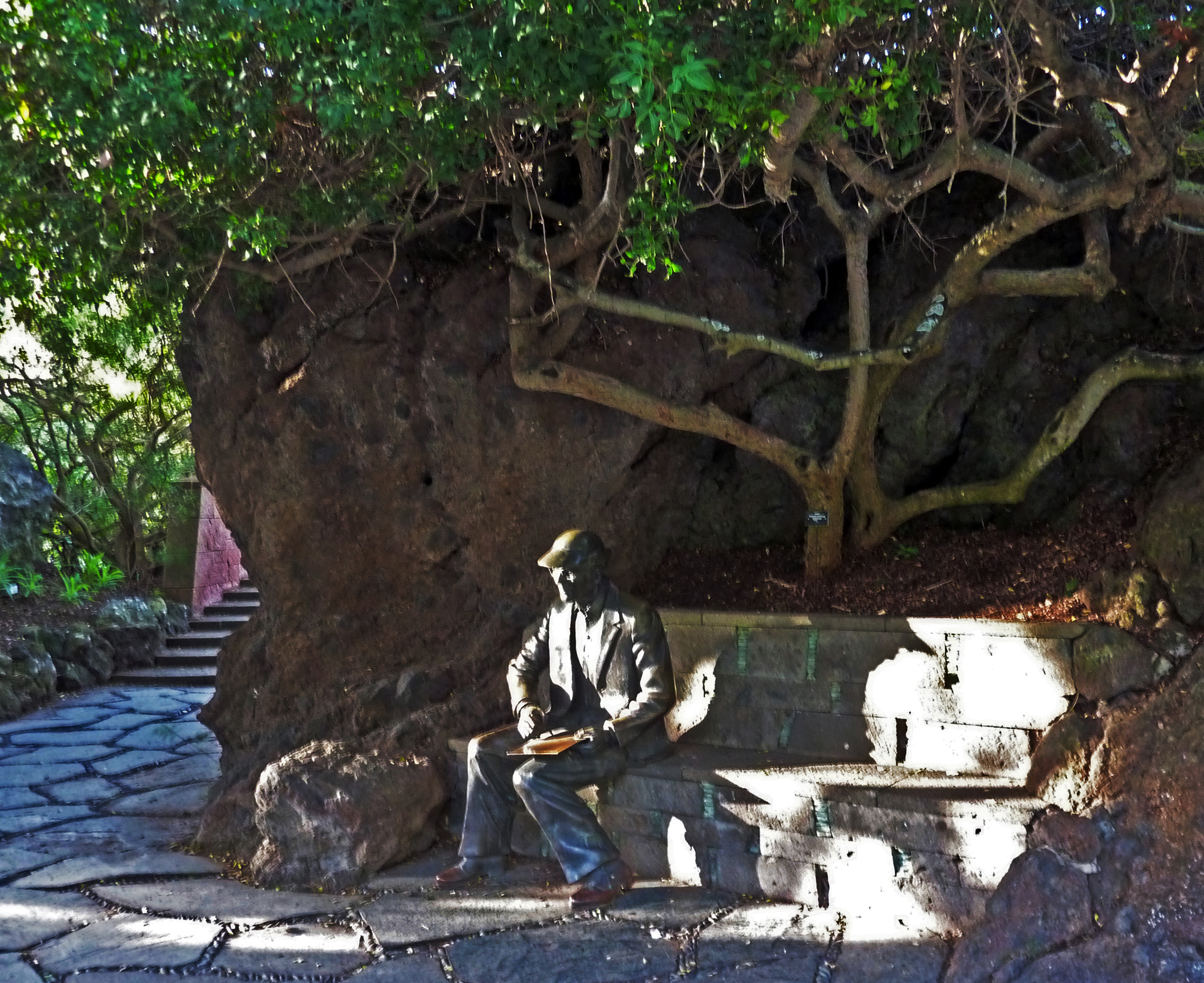
Statue of Sventenius in the Jardín Botánico Viera y Clavijo

Born in the small town of Skirö, Vetlanda, he studied in various universities across Europe. In Spain, he studied at the Marimurta Botanical Garden in Blanes which had been founded in 1920 by Karl Faust. In 1931, he traveled to the Canary Islands. In 1952, he began working at the Botanical Garden of Tenerife (Jardín de Aclimatación de la Orotava). He studied and cataloged unclassified Canarian species.

Sventenius proposed creating a botanical garden dedicated to Canarian flora, continuing the work begun by José de Viera y Clavijo. At Gran Canaria, he founded the Jardín Botánico Canario Viera y Clavijo in 1952 at Tafira Alta, c. 7 km southwest of Las Palmas. It opened its doors to the public in 1959.

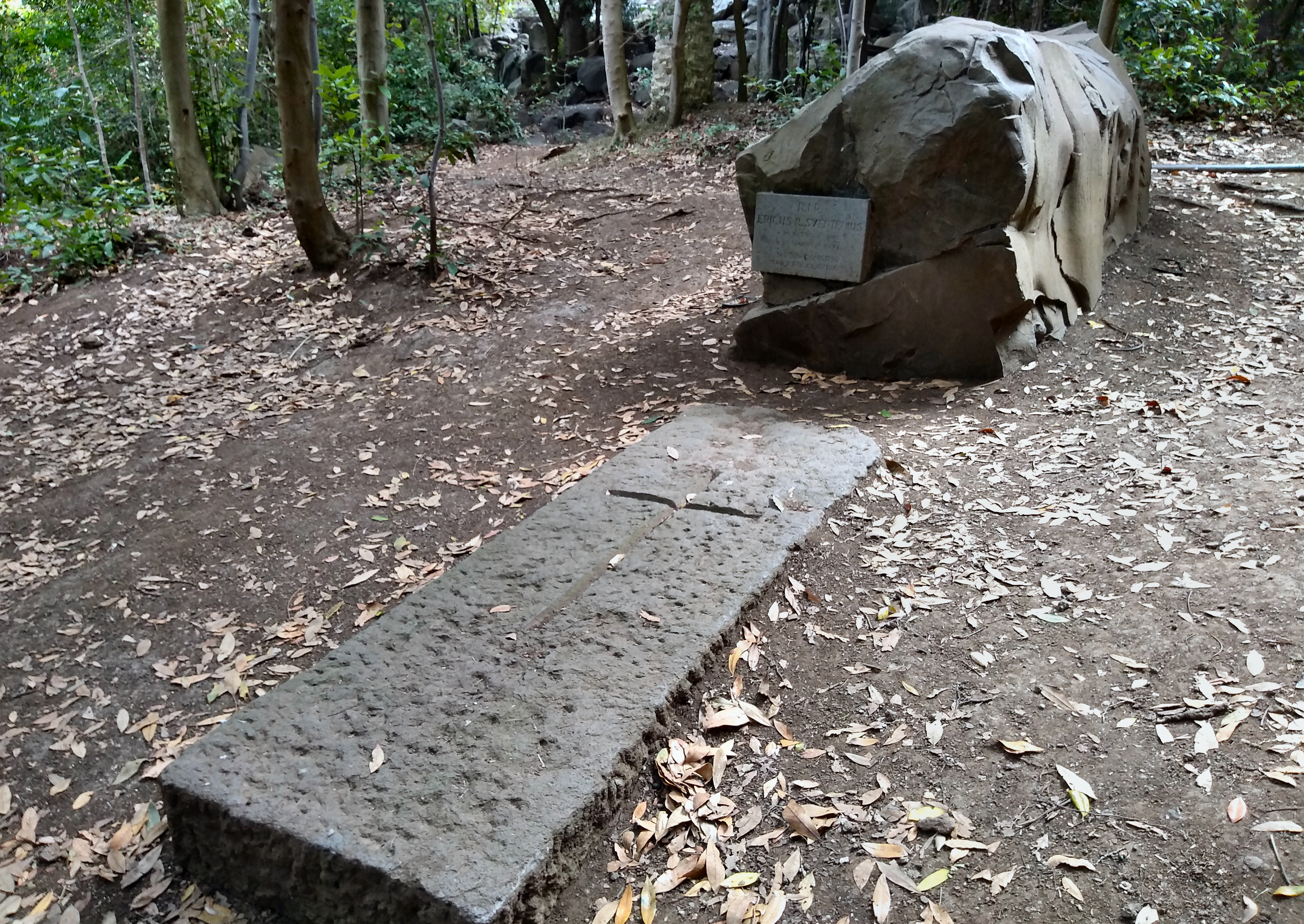
Grave in the Jardín Botánico Canario Viera y Clavijo

He worked as the garden's director until his death in 1973 in a car accident. His grave is in the Jardín Botánico Canario Viera y Clavijo, next to a rock where he used to sit and meditate, relax, and listen to the birds.

- The standard botanical author abbreviation Svent. is applied to the species he described.

== Works by Sventenius ==
- Gerhard Benl, Eric R. Sventenius: Beiträge zur Kenntnis der Pteridophyten-Vegetation und-Flora in der Kanarischen Westprovinz (Tenerife, La Palma, Gomera, Hierro) (aus: Nova Hedwigia 20, S. 413-462, 1970), Lehre: Cramer Vlg., 1970
- E. R. Sventenius et D. Bramwell: Acta phytotaxonomica Barcinonensia; Vol. 7; Heywoodiella genus novum, NBarcelona: Dep. de Botánica, Fac. de Ciencias, Univ. Autónoma, 1971
- G. Kunkel y Sventenius: Los Tiles de Moya. Enumeración florística y datos sobre el futuro parque natural, (Cuadernos de Botánica Canaria, 14/15: 71-89), Las Palmas de Gran Canaria, 1972
- Ericus R. Sventenius: Additamentum ad floram Canariensem, Matriti: Agronomiarum investigationem nationale hispanicum Inst. (Instituto nacional de investigaciones agronómicas), 1960
- Plantae macaronesiensis novae vel minus cognitae, in: Index Seminum Horti Acclimatationis Plantarum Arautapensi, 1968
- Ericus R. Sventenius, Instituto Nacional de Investigaciones Agrarias, Centro de las Islas Canarias (Hrsg.): Notas sobre la flora de las Cañadas de Tenerife, (Cuaderno/INIA; 78), p. 149-171, Madrid: Instituto Nacional de Investigaciones Agrarias, Centro de las Islas Canarias, 1946
- Ericus R. Sventenius, Instituto Nacional de Investigaciones Agrarias (España) (Hrsg.): Contribución al conocimiento de la flora canaria,(Cuaderno/INIA; 79), p. 176-194, Madrid: Instituto Nacional de Investigaciones Agrarias, Centro de las Islas Canarias, 1946
- Ericus R. Sventenius, Instituto Nacional de Investigaciones Agrarias, Centro de las Islas Canarias (Hrsg.): Plantas nuevas o poco conocidas de Tenerife, (Cuaderno/INIA; 111), p. 22-33, Madrid: Instituto Nacional de Investigaciones Agrarias, Centro de las Islas Canarias, 1949
- Ericus R. Sventenius, Instituto Nacional de Investigaciones Agrarias, Centro de las Islas Canarias (Hrsg.): Specilegium canariense III, (Cuaderno/INIA; 125), Madrid: Instituto Nacional de Investigaciones Agrarias, Centro de las Islas Canarias, 1950
- "Additamentum ad Floram Canariensem" Svensson Sventenius, Eric R. 1960.
