= National Pest Plant Accord =

List of pest plants in New Zealand

The National Pest Plant Accord (NPPA) is a New Zealand agreement that identifies pest plants that are prohibited from sale and commercial propagation and distribution.

The Accord initially came into effect on 1 October 2001 between regional councils and government departments with biosecurity responsibilities, but in 2006 was revised to include the Nursery and Garden Industry Association as a member of the decision-making body. Under the Accord, regional councils undertake surveillance to ensure the pest plants are not being sold, propagated or distributed.

The Department of Conservation also lists 328 vascular plant species as environmental weeds – species that infest, are controlled on, or are damaging to land under its control.

== List of species ==
The National Pest Plant Accord is periodically updated, which was last done in 2012:

Scientific name	Common name (1)	Common name (2)	Common name (3)
Ailanthus altissima	tree of heaven		
Akebia quinata	akebia	chocolate vine	five-leaved akebia
Alternanthera philoxeroides	alligator weed	pigweed	
Anredera cordifolia	Madeira vine	mignonette vine	
Araujia hortorum	moth plant	cruel plant	white bladder flower
Aristea ecklonii	aristea	blue iris	
Arundo donax	giant reed	arundo grass	
Asparagus aethiopicus	bushy asparagus	emerald feather	Sprengeri fern, Sprenger's asparagus
Asparagus asparagoides	smilax	bridal creeper	
Asparagus plumosus	asparagus fern		
Asparagus scandens	climbing asparagus		
Berberis darwinii	Darwin's barberry		
Bomarea multiflora	bomarea	climbing alstromeria	
Bryonia cretica	white bryony		
Calluna vulgaris (excluding double flowered cultivars)	heather	ling	
Cardiospermum grandiflorum	balloon vine		
Cardiospermum halicacabum	small balloon vine		
Carpobrotus edulis	ice plant		
Carex pendula	dropping sedge	Otahuna sedge	
Celastrus orbiculatus	climbing spindle berry	Oriental bittersweet	
Cenchrus (all species, excluding C. clandestinus and C. americanus)			
Ceratophyllum demersum	hornwort	coontail	
Cestrum aurantiacum	orange cestrum		
Cestrum elegans	red cestrum		
Cestrum fasciculatum	red cestrum	early jessamine	
Cestrum nocturnum	queen of the night		
Cestrum parqui	green cestrum		
Chrysanthemoides monilifera	boneseed		
Clematis flammula	clematis	fragrant virgin's bower	plume clematis
Clematis vitalba	old man's beard		
Clerodendrum trichotomum	clerodendrum		
Cobaea scandens	cathedral bells		
Cortaderia jubata	purple pampas		
Cortaderia selloana	pampas		
Cotoneaster simonsii	Khasia berry		
Cotyledon orbiculata (and cultivars)	pig's ear		
Crassula multicava	pitted crassula	fairy crassula	
Cyathea cooperi	Australian tree fern	lacy tree fern	
Dipogon lignosus	mile-a-minute		
Drosera capensis	Cape sundew		
Eccremocarpus scaber	Chilean glory creeper	Chilean glory vine	glory vine, Chilean glory flower
Egeria densa	egeria	oxygen weed	Brazilian elodea
Ehrharta villosa	pyp grass		
Eichhornia crassipes	water hyacinth		
Eomecon chionantha	snow poppy	poppy of the dawn	Chinese bloodroot
Equisetum (all species)	horsetail		
Eragrostis curvula	African love grass		
Erigeron karvinskianus	Mexican daisy		
Euonymus japonicus (excluding small-leaved cultivars such as 'Microphylla' and 'Emerald Gem')	Japanese spindle tree		
Fallopia sachalinensis (and hybrids)	giant knotweed		
Ficus rubiginosa	Port Jackson fig		
Fuchsia boliviana	Bolivian fuchsia		
Gunnera tinctoria	Chilean rhubarb		
Gymnocoronis spilanthoides	Senegal tea	temple plant	costata
Hedychium flavescens	yellow ginger		
Hedychium gardnerianum	Kahili ginger		
Heracleum mantegazzianum	giant hogweed	cartwheel flower	wild parsnip, wild rhubarb
Homalanthus populifolius	Queensland poplar	bleeding heart tree	poplar leaved omalanthus
Houttuynia cordata	chameleon plant		
Hydrilla verticillata	hydrilla		
Hydrocleys nymphoides	water poppy		
Hypericum androsaemum	tutsan	sweet amber	
Ipomoea indica	blue morning glory		
Iris pseudacorus	yellow flag	yellow flag iris	
Jasminum humile	Italian jasmine		
Juglans ailantifolia	Japanese walnut		
Kennedia rubicunda	dusky coral pea	coral pea	running postman
Lagarosiphon major	lagarosiphon	oxygen weed	
Lamium galeobdolon	aluminium plant	artillery plant	
Lantana camara	lantana		
Ligustrum lucidum	tree privet		
Lilium formosanum	Formosa lily	trumpet lily	St. Joseph's lily, Taiwan lily
Lonicera japonica	Japanese honeysuckle		
Ludwigia peploides subsp. montevidensis	primrose willow	floating primrose willow	water primrose
Lythrum salicaria	purple loosestrife		
Macfadyena unguis-cati	cat's claw creeper	cat's claw vine	cat's claw ivy, yellow trumpet vine
Maytenus boaria	Chilean mayten	mayten	maiten
Megathyrsus maximus var. pubiglumis	Guinea grass	green panic	buffalo grass
Menyanthes trifoliata	bogbean		
Moraea flaccida	Cape tulip		
Myoporum insulare and hybrids	Tasmanian ngaio	boobialla	
Myrica faya	fire tree	candle berry myrtle	
Myricaria germanica	false tamarisk		
Myriophyllum aquaticum	parrot's feather	thread of life	Brazilian water milfoil
Nassella (all species)	nassella		
Nephrolepis cordifolia	tuber ladder fern	tuber sword fern	
Nuphar lutea	yellow water lily	spatterdock	cow lily, brandybottle
Nymphaea mexicana	Mexican water lily	banana waterlily	
Nymphoides geminata	marshwort	entire marshwort	
Nymphoides peltata	fringed water lily		
Ochna serrulata	Mickey Mouse plant		
Osmunda regalis	royal fern		
Passiflora apetala	bat-wing passion flower		
Passiflora caerulea	blue passion flower		
Passiflora tarminiana	northern banana passionfruit		
Passiflora tripartita (all subspecies)	banana passionfruit		
Phragmites australis	phragmites		
Pilosella (all species)	hawkweed		
Pinus contorta	lodgepole pine	contorta pine	
Pistia stratiotes	water lettuce		
Pithecoctenium crucigerum	monkey's comb	monkey's hairbrush	
Pittosporum undulatum	sweet pittosporum	Victorian box	Australian cheesewood
Plectranthus ciliatus	plectranthus	blue spur flower	
Polygala myrtifolia (excluding cultivar 'Grandiflora')	sweet pea shrub	sweet pea bush	myrtle leaf milkwort
Polypodium vulgare	polypody	common polypody	
Potamogeton perfoliatus	clasped pondweed		
Prunus serotina	rum cherry		
Pyracantha angustifolia	firethorn	orange firethorn	yellow firethorn
Reynoutria japonica (syn. Fallopia japonica) (and hybrids)	Asiatic knotweed	Japanese knotweed	Mexican bamboo
Rhamnus alaternus	rhamnus	evergreen buckthorn	
Rhododendron ponticum	wild rhododendron	pontic rhododendron	pontian rhododendron
Sagittaria montevidensis	arrowhead	sagittaria	Californian arrowhead
Sagittaria platyphylla	sagittaria	delta arrowhead	
Sagittaria sagittifolia	arrowhead		
Salix cinerea	grey willow	pussy willow	grey sallow
Salix × fragilis	crack willow		
Salvinia molesta	salvinia	Kariba weed	
Schinus terebinthifolius	Christmas berry	Brazilian pepper tree	
Schoenoplectus californicus	Californian bulrush		
Selaginella kraussiana	African club moss	selaginella	
Solanum marginatum	white edged nightshade		
Solanum mauritianum	woolly nightshade	tobacco weed	wild tobacco tree
Syzygium smithii	monkey apple		
Tradescantia fluminensis	wandering Willie		
Tropaeolum speciosum	Chilean flame creeper		
Tussilago farfara	coltsfoot		
Typha latifolia	great reedmace	cumbungi	common cattail
Utricularia arenaria	bladderwort		
Utricularia gibba	bladderwort	humped bladderwort	
Utricularia livida	bladderwort		
Utricularia sandersonii	bladderwort		
Vallisneria australis	eelgrass		
Zantedeschia aethiopica	green goddess		
Zizania latifolia	Manchurian wild rice	Manchurian rice grass	

== See also ==
- Invasive species in New Zealand
