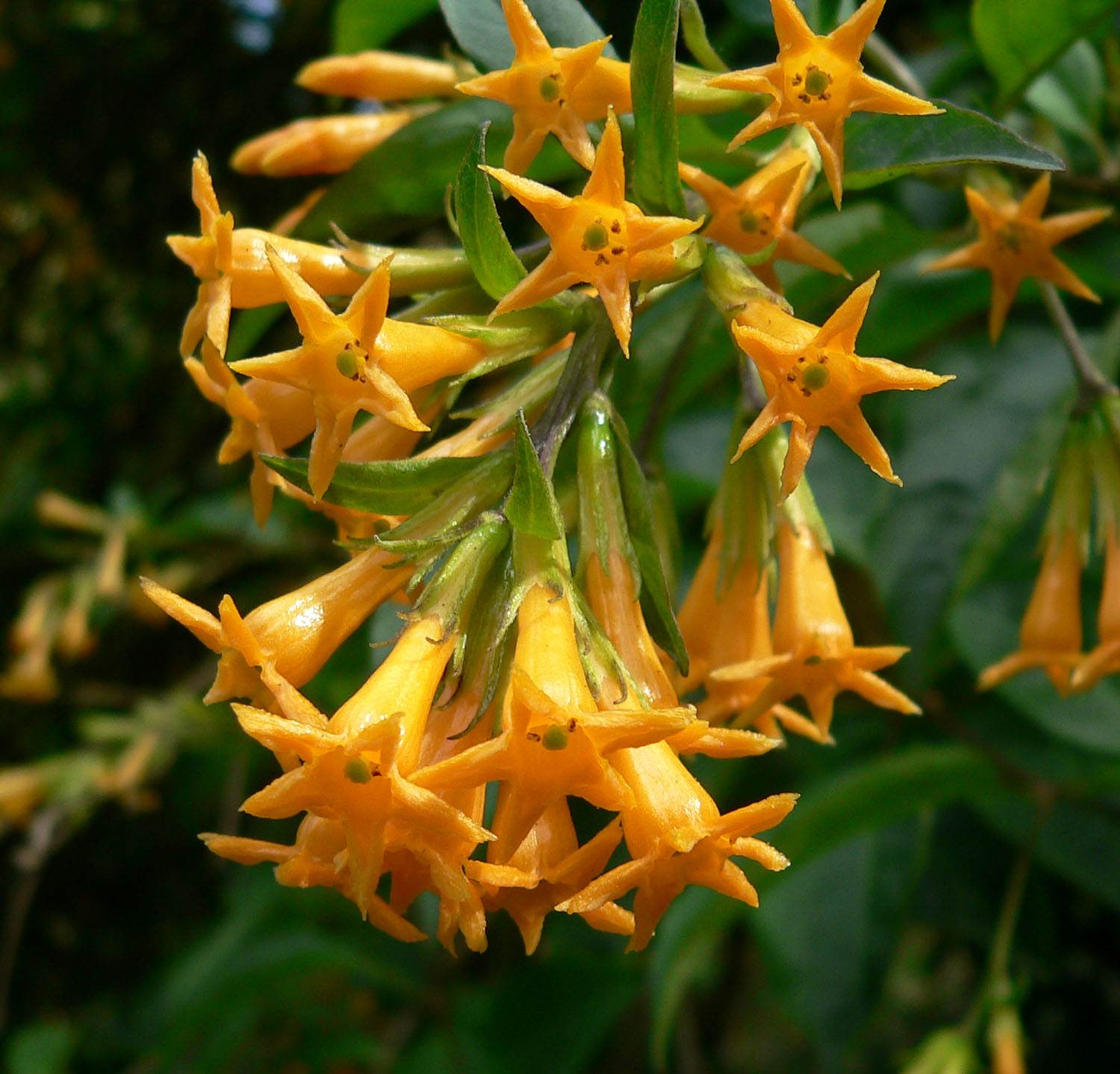

Conservation status
- Least Concern (IUCN 3.1)

Scientific classification
- Kingdom: Plantae
- Clade: Embryophytes
- Clade: Tracheophytes
- Clade: Spermatophytes
- Clade: Angiosperms
- Clade: Eudicots
- Clade: Asterids
- Order: Solanales
- Family: Solanaceae
- Genus: Cestrum
- Species: C. aurantiacum

Binomial name
- Cestrum aurantiacum Lindl.

Synonyms
- Cestrum auriculatum Ruiz & Pav.; Cestrum chaculanum Loes.; Cestrum paucinervium Francey; Cestrum pedunculare Pav. ex Dunal; Cestrum regelii Planch.; Cestrum warszewiczii Klotzsch; Habrothamnus aurantiacus Regel

= Cestrum aurantiacum =

Species of plant

Cestrum aurantiacum (orange cestrum, "orange jessamine", orange-flowering jessamine, and yellow cestrum; syn. Capraria lanceolata L.f.) is a species of shrub in the potato family Solanaceae that is native to tropical regions of North and South America.

== Description ==
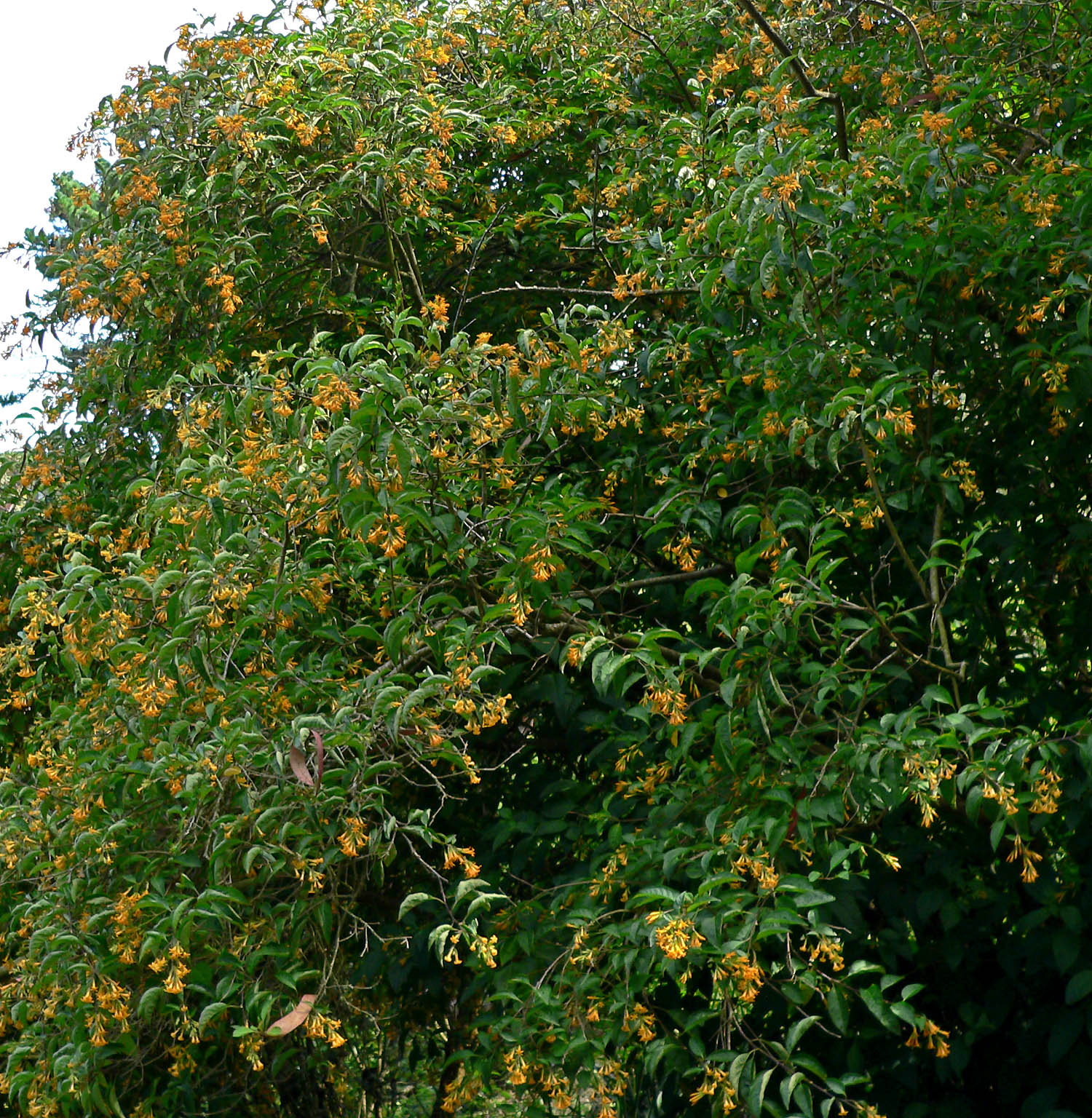
Large shrubby plant

Cestrum aurantiacum is a shrub 1.5 to 6.5 m tall or occasionally up to 8.5 m tall. The branches are glabrous or sparsely tomentose. The leaves are ovate to elliptical, 7 to 17 cm long and 2.5 to 5.5 cm wide. Both sides of the leaf are glabrous, the tip is acuminate or shortly tapering, the base is acuminate to blunt or occasionally shortly tapering. The petioles are 1 to 3 cm long and glabrous.

=== Inflorescences ===
The terminal or axillary, umbelliferous or racemose inflorescences consist of a few to a few flowers. The inflorescence axis is finely hairy or hairless, the bracts linear and later deciduous. The flowers are sessile, almost sessile or stand on flower stalks up to 1.5 mm long. Blooming constantly through the year, the flowers produce a citrus-like scent at night.

The calyx is tubular, 5 to 6.5 (rarely up to 9) mm long and hairless except for the (0.7) 1 to 2 (3) mm long, ciliate calyx lobes. These are awl-shaped and long-spiked or rounded and long-spiked and run further down the calyx tube as five nerve tracts.

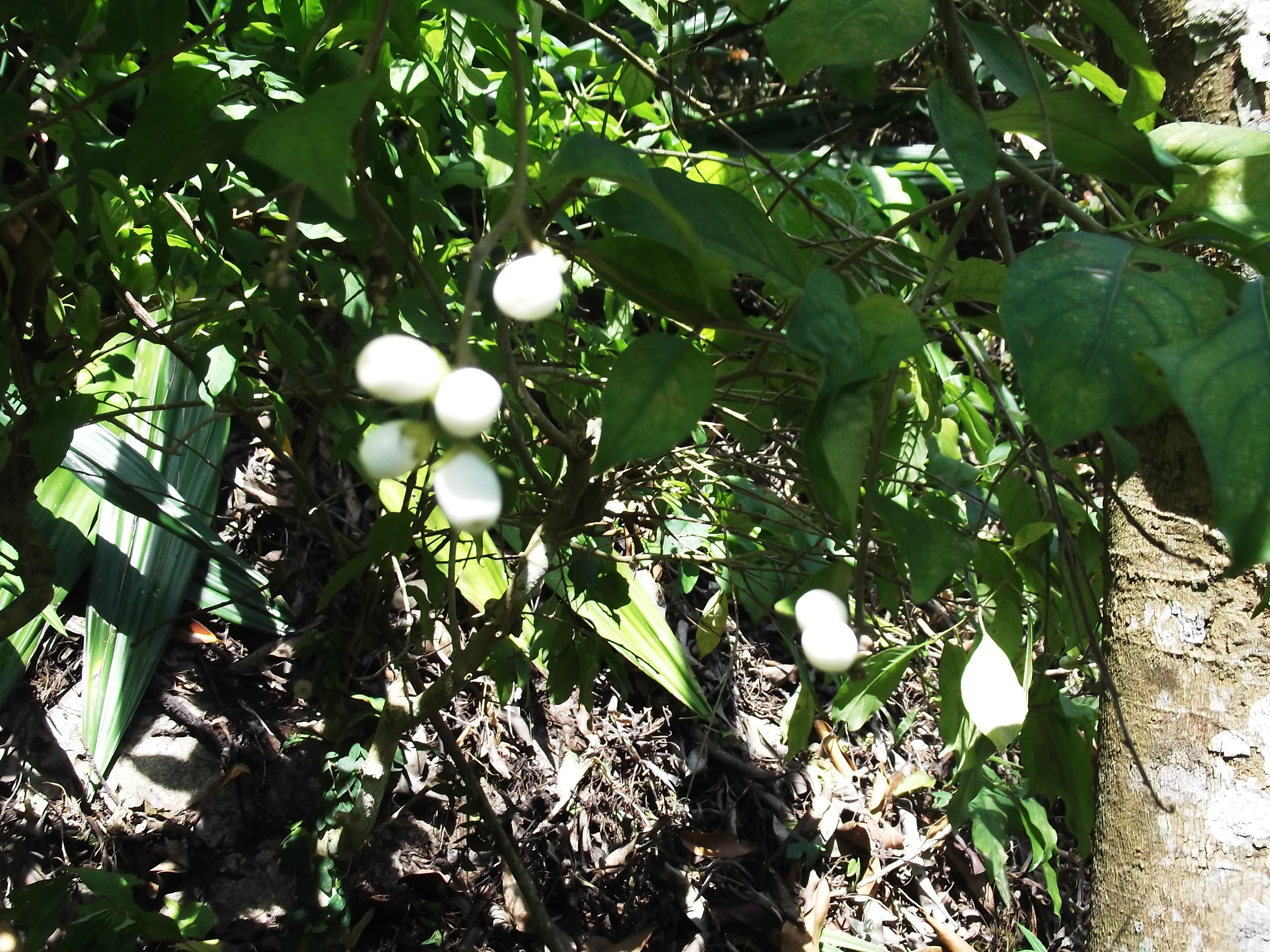
White berries

The orange or rarely yellow corolla has a 17.5 to 20 mm long corolla tube, the corolla lobes are 3 to 3.5 (5.5) mm long, egg-shaped or lanceolate. The edges are covered with papillose hairs. The stamens are 4 to 6.5 mm long, swollen and bent over in a knee-like shape, groove-like or almost appendage-like. The base and the vascular bundles of the stamens are hairy. The style is 16.5 to 18.5 mm long.

The fruits are white berries (which are distinguished from the black fruits of Cestrum parqui), 8 to 12 mm long, with seven to nine seeds, which are about 3 to 5 mm long.

== Distribution ==
This species is distributed in an area extending from southern Mexico to Nicaragua, where it is found in moist thickets or forests, often in pine-oak forests at altitudes between 1000 and 2600 m.

== Cultivation ==
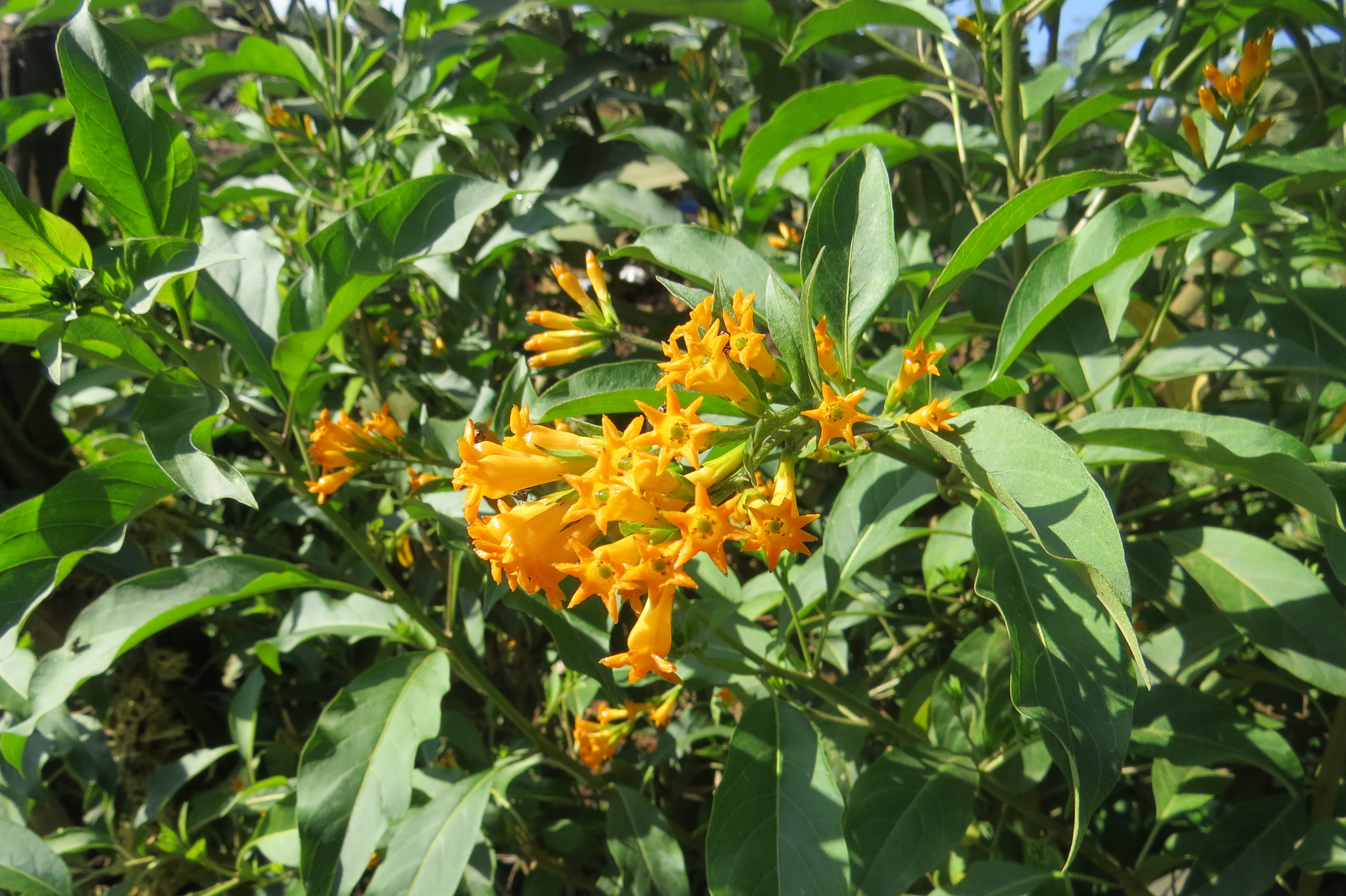
Foliage and flowers

This plant is used as an ornamental plant, and it is a poisonous plant if eaten by animals. However, the species is widely grown as an ornamental plant and in some places it has escaped from cultivation and returned to the wild. In parts of Africa, Asia and Australia, the species has become a harmful invasive species. The top of the plant is hardy to zone 8 but it is root hardy to zone 7.

Drought tolerant, the species grows best in occasionally moist, humus-rich, well-drained soil in full sun or partial shade. The size of the shrub is easily controlled by pruning. It is regarded as medicinal in Peru. The flowers attract hummingbirds, butterflies, and other pollinating insects.
