= Blue enigma =

Blue enigma can refer to:

- a cultivar of Salvia guaranitica
