= Cestrum tomentosum =

Scientific classification
- Kingdom: Plantae
- Clade: Tracheophytes
- Clade: Angiosperms
- Clade: Eudicots
- Clade: Asterids
- Order: Solanales
- Family: Solanaceae
- Genus: Cestrum
- Species: C. tomentosum

Binomial name
- Cestrum tomentosum L.f.

Species of plant

Cestrum tomentosum is a plant in the genus Cestrum that ranges throughout central and South America. It process high fragrant pink flowers followed by pink colored berries. All parts are poisonous if eaten.

== See also ==
- Cestrum
