= Indian cucumber =

Indian cucumber may refer to:

- Indian cucumber (Hindi: kankri or khira, Malayalam & Tamil : vellari, Telugu: dosekaya or dosakai, Bengali: shosha, Assamese:tihu or tiyoh), large variety of cucumber (Cucumis sativus) popular in India as a vegetable
- Indian cucumber-root Medeola virginiana
