= Free-flowering =

Plants with extended blooming time

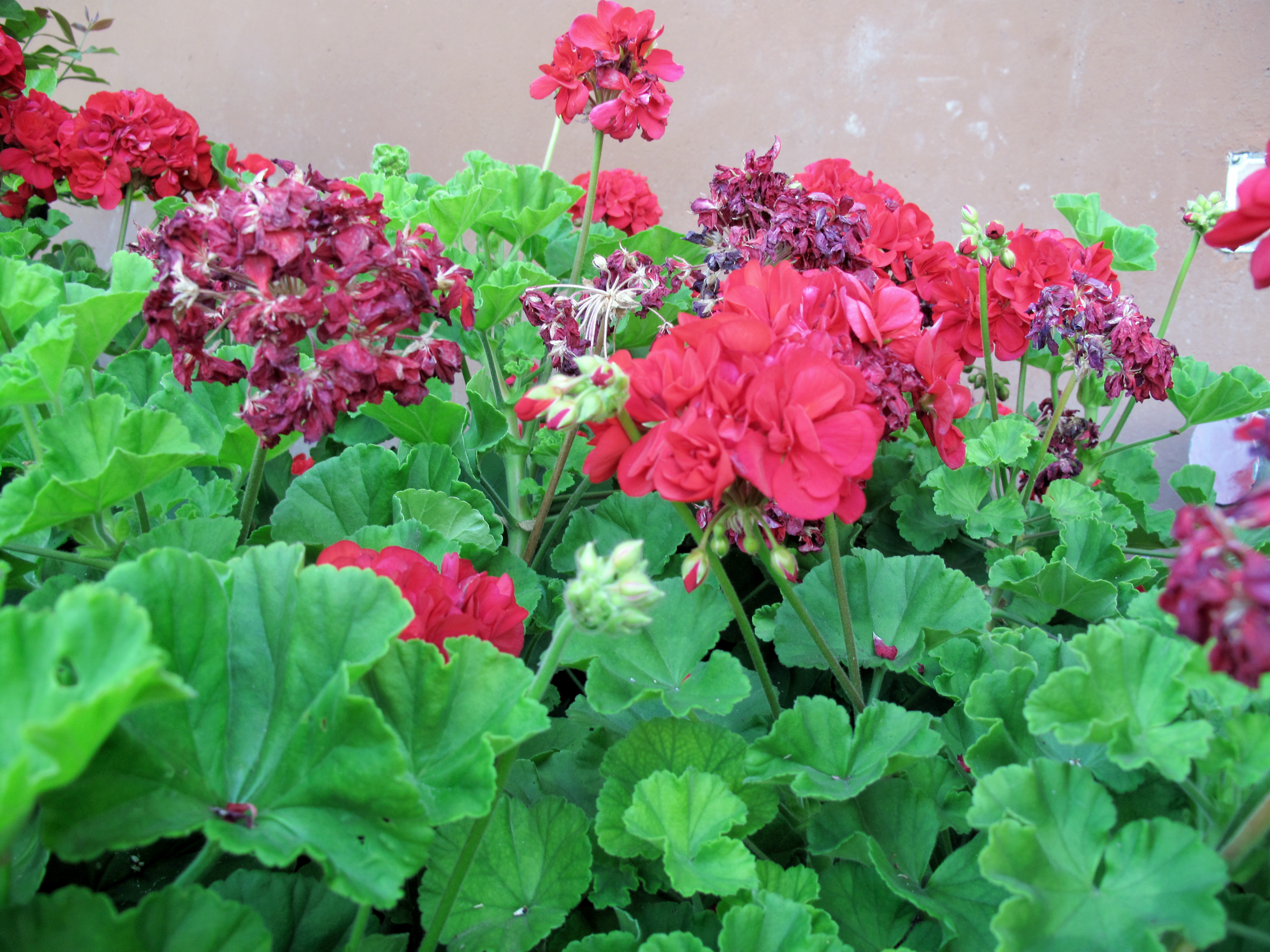
Zonal pelargoniums are examples of free-flowering plants, which bloom profusely throughout the year.

In gardening, the term free-flowering is used to describe flowering plants that have a long bloom time and may often lack a defined blooming season, whereby producing flowers profusely over an extended period of time, at times all-year round. The terms long-flowering and long-blooming are also used for perennial plants that bloom for much of the year.

== Examples ==
Examples of free-flowering or long flowering plants include salvias, thunbergias, loniceras, roses, lavenders, periwinkles, gaillardias, oleanders, begonias, bougainvilleas, morning glories, geraniums/pelargoniums, hibiscuses, and lantanas.

== List ==
This list includes plant species that are free-flowering, particularly in warmer climates:

- Ajuga reptans
- Allamanda cathartica
- Canna indica
- Cestrum parqui
- Crossandra infundibuliformis
- Clitoria ternatea
- Coleus neochilus
- Dimorphotheca ecklonis
- Euphorbia milii
- Euryops pectinatus
- Hibbertia scandens
- Impatiens hawkeri
- Ipomoea cairica
- Ipomoea indica
- Ixora coccinea
- Jatropha curcas
- Mandevilla sanderi
- Maurandya scandens
- Murraya paniculata
- Mussaenda erythrophylla
- Pandorea jasminoides
- Plumbago auriculata
- Plumbago indica
- Pseudogynoxys chenopodioides
- Salvia guaranitica
- Salvia splendens
- Sphagneticola trilobata
- Streptocarpus sect. Saintpaulia
- Thunbergia alata
- Thunbergia erecta
- Tibouchina urvilleana
- Westringia fruticosa
