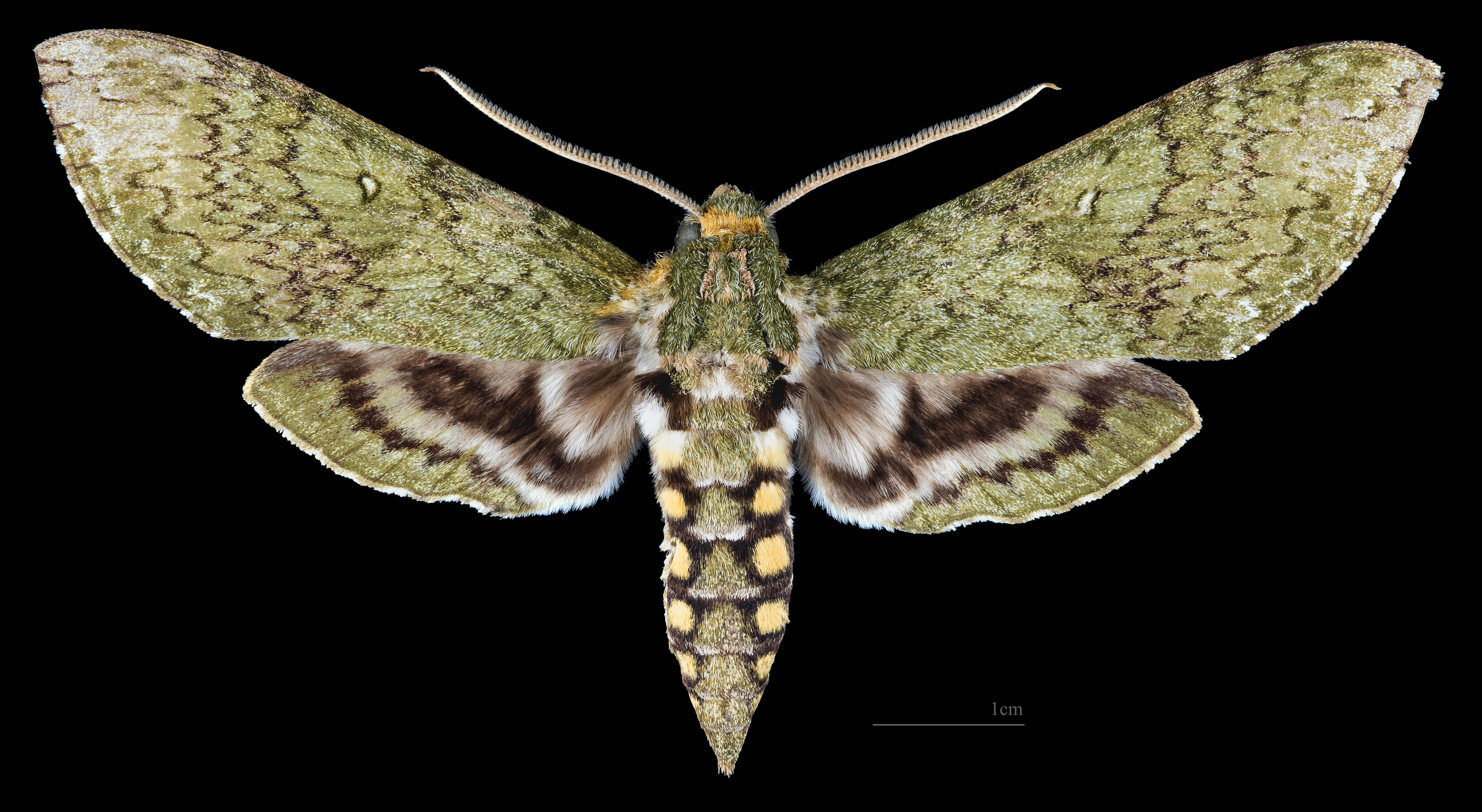
- Manduca afflicta afflicta Male Dorsal
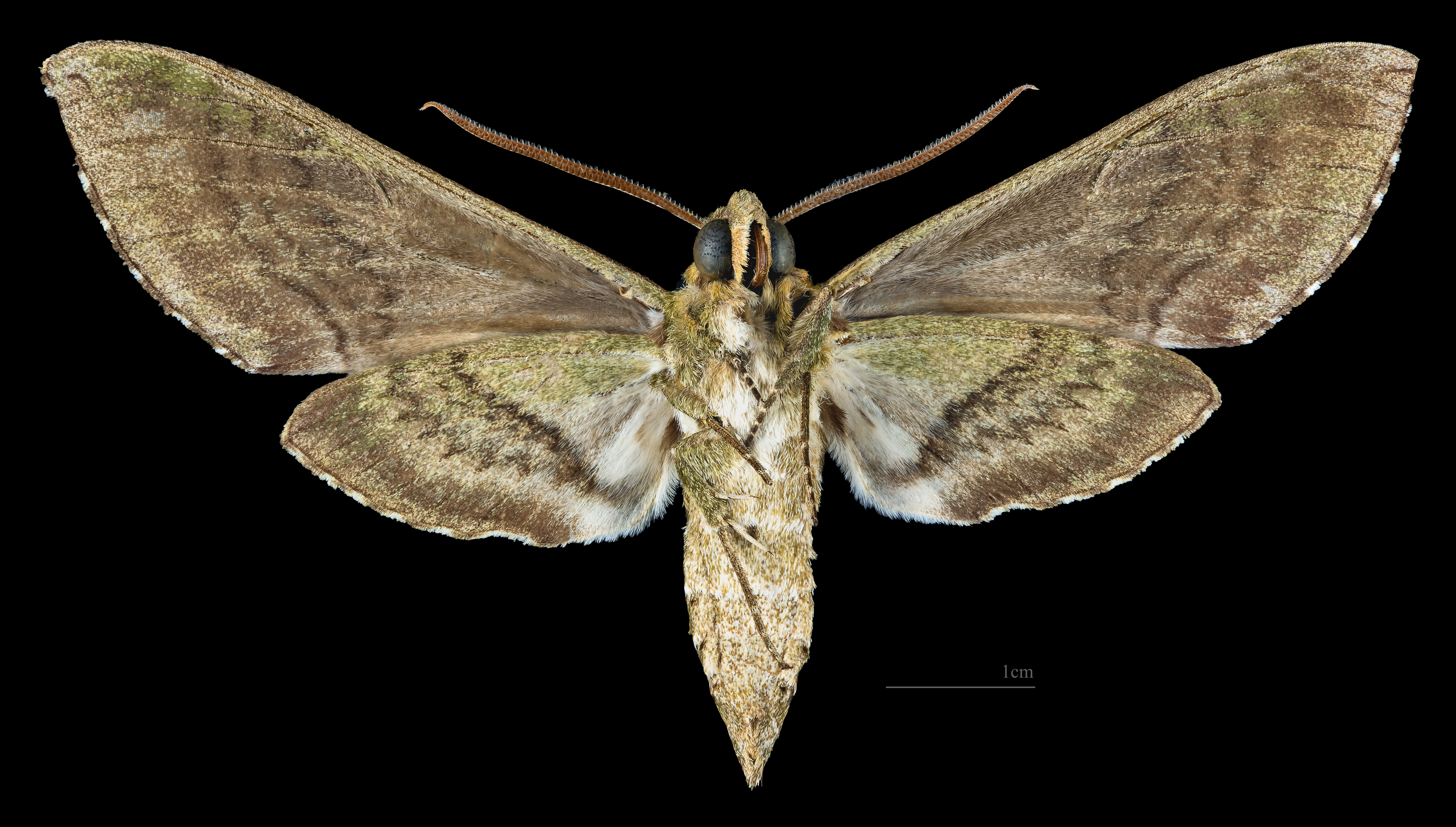
- Manduca afflicta afflicta Male ventral

Scientific classification
- Kingdom: Animalia
- Phylum: Arthropoda
- Class: Insecta
- Order: Lepidoptera
- Family: Sphingidae
- Genus: Manduca
- Species: M. afflicta

Binomial name
- Manduca afflicta (Grote, 1865)

Synonyms
- Sphinx afflicta Grote, 1865; Protoparce afflicta bahamensis Clark, 1916

= Manduca afflicta =

Species of moth

Manduca afflicta is a moth of the family Sphingidae known from Cuba and the Bahamas. It is similar to Manduca sexta. Adults feed on nectar from flowers. The larvae have been recorded feeding on Cestrum diurnum, the day-blooming jessamine, a member of the family Solanaceae.

== Subspecies ==
- M. a. afflicta (Cuba)
- M. a. bahamensis (B. P. Clark, 1916) (the Bahamas)
