= Orange jessamine =

Orange jessamine is a common name for two species of plants:

- Murraya paniculata, a species of plant in the family Rutaceae
- Cestrum aurantiacum, a species of plant in the family Solanaceae
