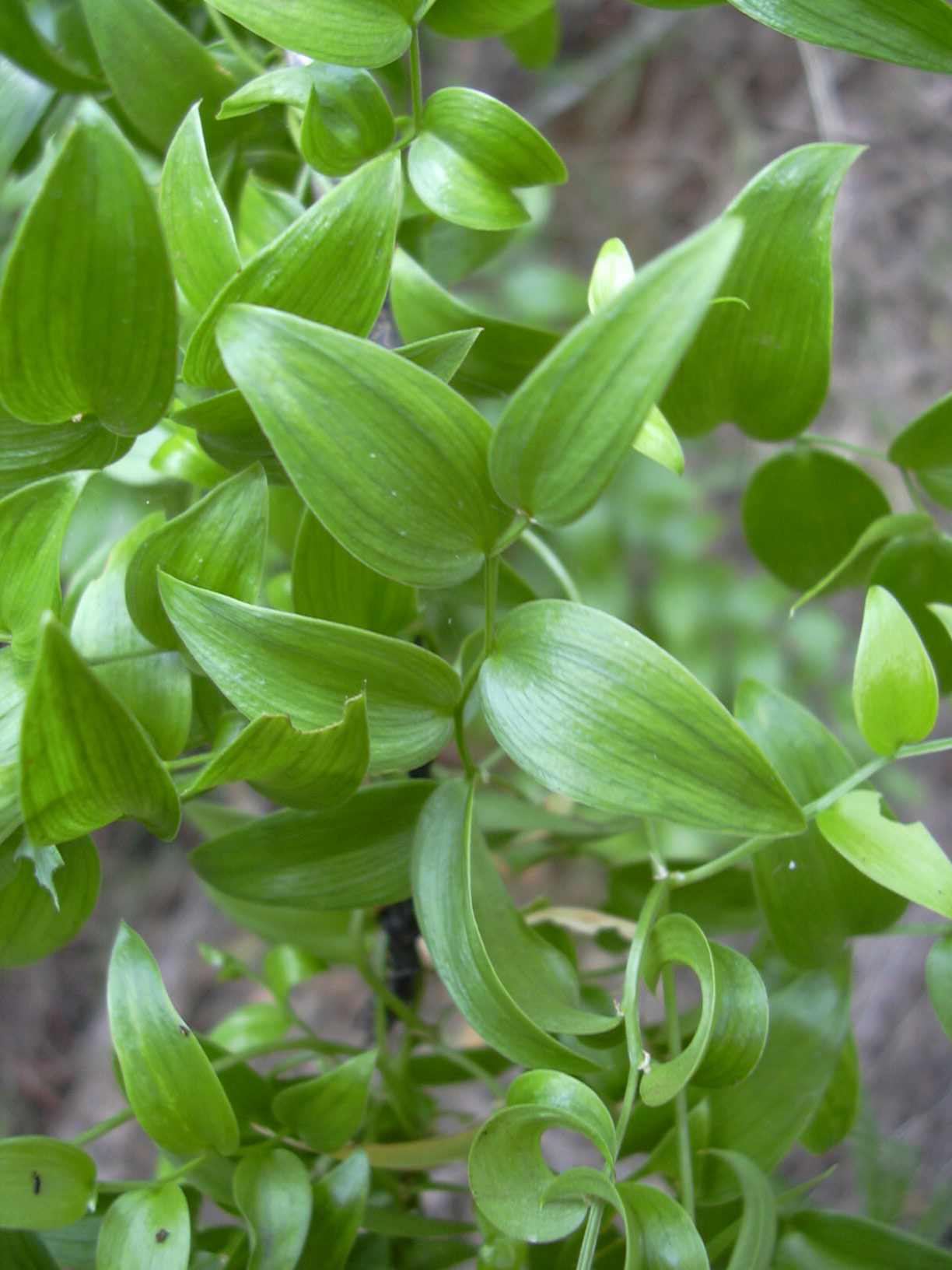

Scientific classification
- Kingdom: Plantae
- Clade: Embryophytes
- Clade: Tracheophytes
- Clade: Angiosperms
- Clade: Monocots
- Order: Asparagales
- Family: Asparagaceae
- Subfamily: Asparagoideae
- Genus: Asparagus
- Species: A. asparagoides

Binomial name
- Asparagus asparagoides (L.) Druce 1914

Synonyms
- List: Medeola asparagoides L. 1753; Asparagus kuisibensis Dinter; Asparagus medeoloides (L.f.) Thunb.; Asparagus medeoloides var. angustifolius (Mill.) Baker; Asparagus medeoloides var. falciformis (Kunth) Baker; Dracaena medeoloides L.f; Elachanthera sewelliae F.Muell.; Elide asparagoides (L.) Kerguélen; Luzuriaga sewelliae (F.Muell.) K.Krause; Medeola angustifolia Mill.; Medeola latifolia Salisb.; Myrsiphyllum angustifolium (Mill.) Willd.; Myrsiphyllum falciforme Kunth; Ruscus volubilis Thunb.; Myrsiphyllum asparagoides (L.) Willd.

= Asparagus asparagoides =

Species of flowering plant

Asparagus asparagoides, commonly known as bridal creeper, bridal-veil creeper, gnarboola, smilax or smilax asparagus, is a herbaceous climbing plant of the family Asparagaceae native to eastern and southern Africa. Sometimes grown as an ornamental plant, it has become a serious environmental weed in Australia and New Zealand.

== Taxonomy ==
Linnaeus first described this species as Medeola asparagoides in 1753. It has been reclassified in the genus Asparagus by W. Wight in 1909, or Myrsiphyllum by Carl Ludwig von Willdenow in 1808.

== Description ==
Asparagus asparagoides grows as a herbaceous vine with a scrambling or climbing habit which can reach 3 m (10 ft) in length. It has shiny green leaf-like structures (cladodes) which are flattened stems rather than true leaves. They measure up to 4 cm long by 2 cm wide. The pendent white flowers appear over winter and spring, from July to September. It is rhizomatous, and bears tubers which reach 6 cm (2.4 in) by 2 cm (1.8 in) in size.

=== Related species and diagnostic characters ===
Within southern Africa, it is frequently confused with the closely related species Asparagus ovatus and Asparagus multituberosus. All three species have very similar growth forms and cladodes. The key diagnostic character for distinguishing them is their tuber arrangement (although, even in this key diagnostic character, there is a gradation, making it difficult to identify intermediate specimens).

Asparagus asparagoides has radially arranged tubers, very close to the rhizome (or even sessile). Asparagus ovatus has distant tubers that are far removed from the rhizome. This is likely to be an adaptation to the loose sands of its typical habitat. A. asparagoides also has tubers that are relatively few (c. 12) and large (up to 15 cm long). Asparagus multituberosus has tubers that are very numerous and small (c. 5 cm). These are likely to be an adaptation to the hard, dry soils of its typical inland habitat.

There are other minor or less consistent diagnostic characters: The cladodes of A. asparagoides are usually ovate-acuminate, and three big veins are often more pronounced, on each side of the cladode. The cladodes of A. ovatus are usually ovate (i.e., less pointed), and they are often folded. This distinction is not reliable though.
The flowers of A. asparagoides are usually solitary (one in each axil), while those of A. ovatus are either solitary or in groups of up to three.

== Distribution and habitat ==
It ranges throughout tropical Africa, south to Namibia, and the fynbos in South Africa, as far south as Cape Town.

It has become naturalised in parts of southern California and Australia, where it is considered an invasive plant.

== Uses ==
Asparagus asparagoides, often under the name smilax, is commonly used in floral arrangements or home decorating.

== Invasive species ==
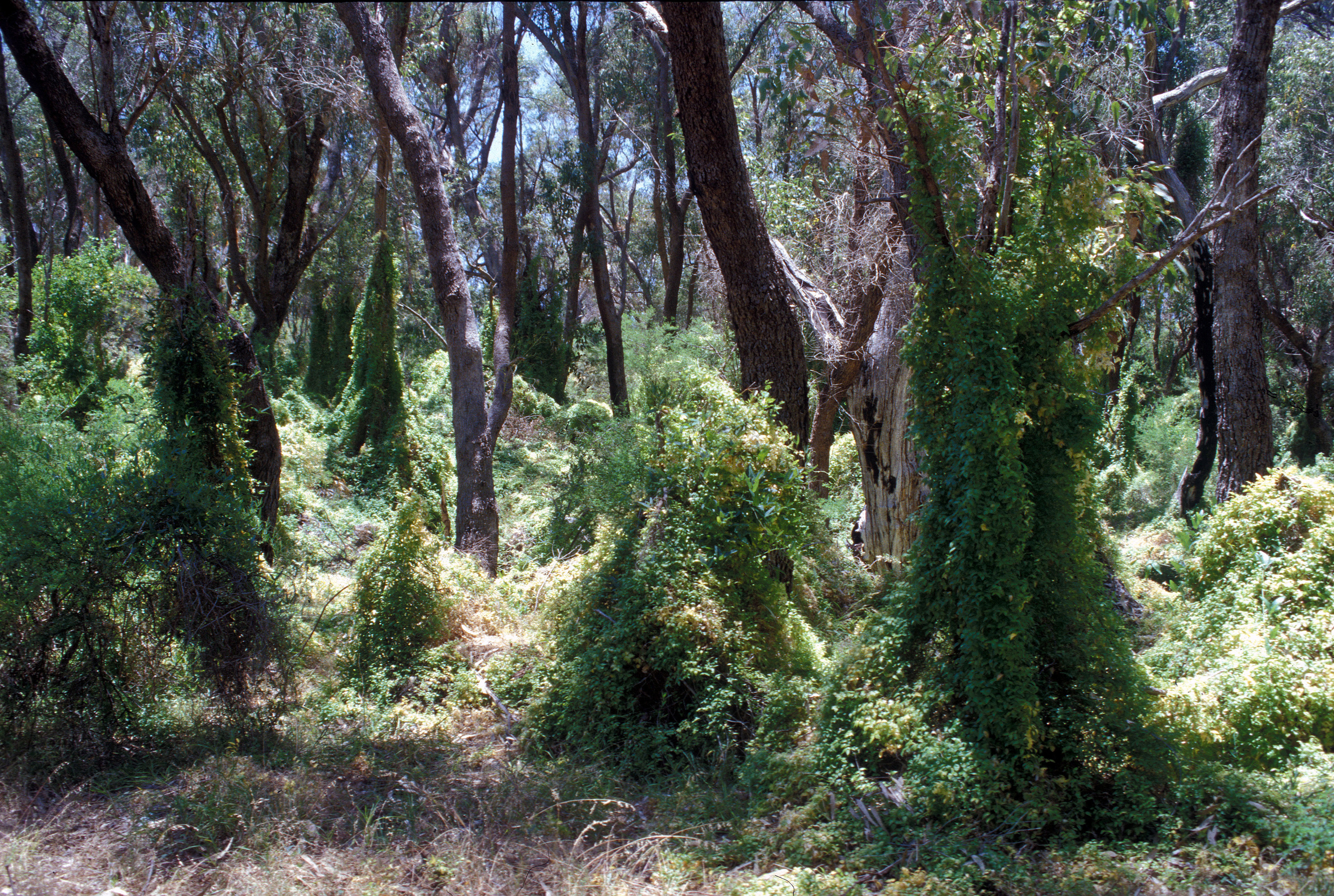
A bridal creeper infestation in Australia

A. asparagoides is a major weed species in southern Australia and in New Zealand. In Australia, it is listed as a Weed of National Significance.

It was introduced to Australia from South Africa around 1857, for use as a foliage plant, especially in bridal bouquets (hence the common name). It has escaped into the bush and smothers the native vegetation with the thick foliage and thick underground mat of tubers which restrict root growth of other species. It is recognised as one of the 20 "weeds of national significance". The seeds are readily spread in the droppings of birds, rabbits and foxes, as well as the plant extending its root system. CSIRO have introduced several biological controls in an attempt to reduce the spread and impact of the weed.

In New Zealand, A. asparagoides is listed under the National Pest Plant Accord and is classified as an "unwanted organism".
