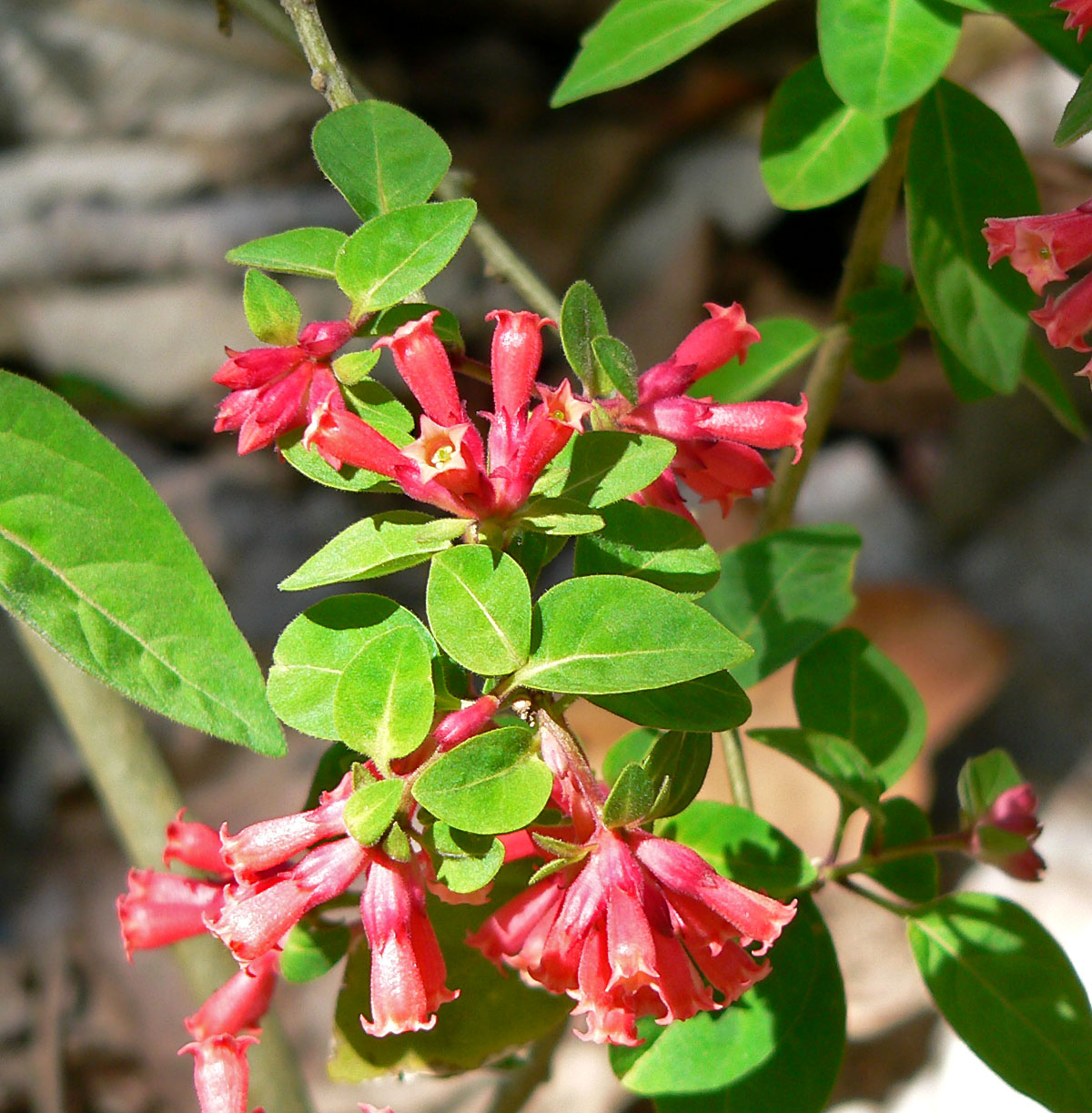

Scientific classification
- Kingdom: Plantae
- Clade: Tracheophytes
- Clade: Angiosperms
- Clade: Eudicots
- Clade: Asterids
- Order: Solanales
- Family: Solanaceae
- Genus: Cestrum
- Species: C. fasciculatum

Binomial name
- Cestrum fasciculatum (Schltdl.) Miers

= Cestrum fasciculatum =

Species of flowering plant

Cestrum fasciculatum is a species of flowering plant in the family Solanaceae known by the common names early jessamine and red cestrum. It is native to central Mexico, but it is also kept elsewhere as an ornamental plant.

== Description ==
This is a gangly evergreen shrub reaching a maximum height of over two meters. The stems, and especially new twigs, are sometimes purple in color and slightly hairy. It bears hairy, oval-shaped, pointed green leaves up to 13 centimeters long.

=== Inflorescence ===
Plentiful inflorescences appear at the tips of stem branches, each a dense cluster of up to 10 hairy red flowers. Each tubular flower is 2 or 3 centimeters long, counting the elongated calyx of sepals and the long corolla. The fruit is a berry about 1.5 centimeters wide which is red on the outside and white inside with about 10 small brown seeds.
