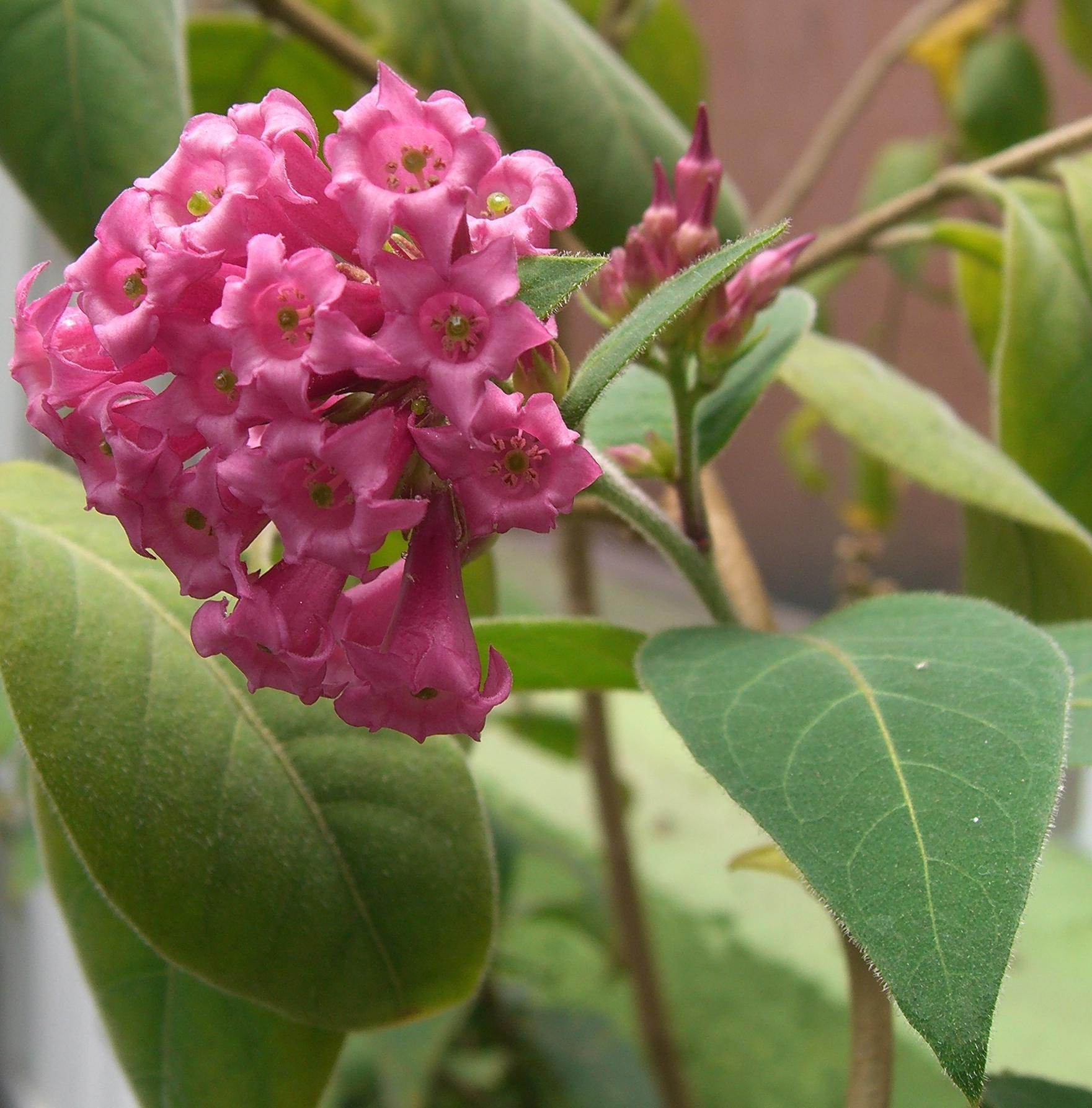

Scientific classification
- Kingdom: Plantae
- Clade: Tracheophytes
- Clade: Angiosperms
- Clade: Eudicots
- Clade: Asterids
- Order: Solanales
- Family: Solanaceae
- Genus: Cestrum
- Species: C. elegans

Binomial name
- Cestrum elegans (Brongn. ex Neumann) Schltdl.

Subspecies
- Cestrum elegans var. elegans; Cestrum elegans var. longiflorum Francey; Cestrum elegans var. smithii Bailey; Cestrum elegans var. totutla Dunal; Cestrum elegans var. truncata Fernald

Synonyms
- Cestrum purpureum (Lindl.) Standl.

= Cestrum elegans =

Species of flowering plant

Cestrum elegans, the purple cestrum, red cestrum, or bastard jasmine, is a species of flowering plants in the genus Cestrum.

== History ==
Cestrum elegans belongs to the family Solanaceae. Solanaceae is derived from the Greek language meaning a plant of uncertain definition. Other accepted synonyms for the species are C. purpureum and C. paniculatum. The plant is most commonly known as the Bastard Jasmine. Henri Guillaume Galeotti first collected the plant at Lake Chapala, Mexico in 1837. Cestrum elegans was originally named by Adolphe Theodore de Brongniart as Habrothamnus elegans. An official name change to Cestrum elegans took place by Diederich Franz Leonhard von Schlechtendal a German botanist, in 1846 to fit current naming standards. Cestrum elegans was first introduced to Europe as an ornamental plant in 1840.

== Description ==
Cestrum elegans is a slender evergreen that reaches seven feet in height. Overall, the structure is very compact with only a few branches. The panicles form in closely compacted groups at the top of the plant. Downy, pendulous, hairy shoots carry simple, alternate oblong leaves with pointed tips. Leaves are mid green in color and ovate with entire margins. Leaves are arranged alternately on the stem and grow to be eight centimeters long. Leaves also have a distasteful smell, but the flowers smell sweet. Leaves bear funnel-shaped bright purplish-red (almost blood red) flowers with 5 pointed lobes.

Flowers are typically 2 cm long. Immature stems are densely covered with purplish hairs that become woody as maturity is reached. When grown in warm temperate climates the leaves are soft and hairy. Flowers bloom from August to March. Berries can be produced and are crimson to dark red in color. Grows best in a semi-shaded environment, in fertile, non-dense soil. Withstands times of drought. Pollination occurs through hummingbirds. All parts of plant are poisonous when ingested.

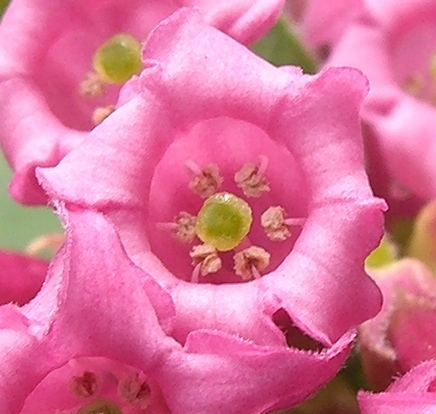

== Geographical range ==
Requires a warm temperate to tropical climate that remains frost-free. Can be found in the tropics of the Americas, ranging from Florida to central Chile and some parts of Britain. C. elegans can be found growing in central to southern California, northeast Texas, and central to southern Florida. The lowest temperature tolerated by the plant is −7 °C, corresponding to USDA zone 9.

== Uses ==
Typically grown in a greenhouse, where it will grow up pillars or rafters, also grown as a wall shrub in sheltered gardens. Often grown in conservatories and cool glasshouses or in hanging baskets. Grows best in large containers when being trained to grow up a large object such as a pillar. Very suitable as an ornamental plant. Rather drought tolerant. Will attract many pollinators and hummingbirds.

== Propagation ==
Propagate by cuttings of half-ripe shoots in summer and root with slight bottom heat. Grow in rich, light soil. Requires moist soil; if potted, water every few days, but no more than twice a week. Soil needs to remain moist but not water-logged. Seeds are dispersed via birds and forms of soil movement including flooding. Enjoys half-sun, half-shaded areas and will require pruning to encourage growth and strength. Overwinter in a cool spot exposed to a lot of sun.

== Invasive status ==
Because it has been widely distributed as an ornamental plant, C. elegans has escaped cultivation in a number of countries outside of its native distribution. In these new countries C. elegans is considered an invasive alien. Seed dispersal covers large areas, when seeds germinate dense, shady masses are formed. These masses prevent native plants from getting enough sunlight to grow. C. elegans is most likely to invade disturbed and open forest edges, streamsides, shrublands, and dry gullies.

== Interesting facts ==
Cestrum elegans has a large genome size and few chromosomes. Cestrum elegans was found to contain telomeres with repeat motif TTTTTTAGGG. This repeat motif is different from that of a normal angiosperm telomere, which contains TTTAGGG. This shift is thought to have happened through the separation of Cestrum, Sessea, and Vestia genera.

Cestrum elegans received an Award of Merit in 1975.

The flowers give off a sweet smell while the leaves produce a distasteful smell when bruised.

All parts of the plant are poisonous. It is a strong-alkaloid containing plant that is now classified as an invasive alien.
