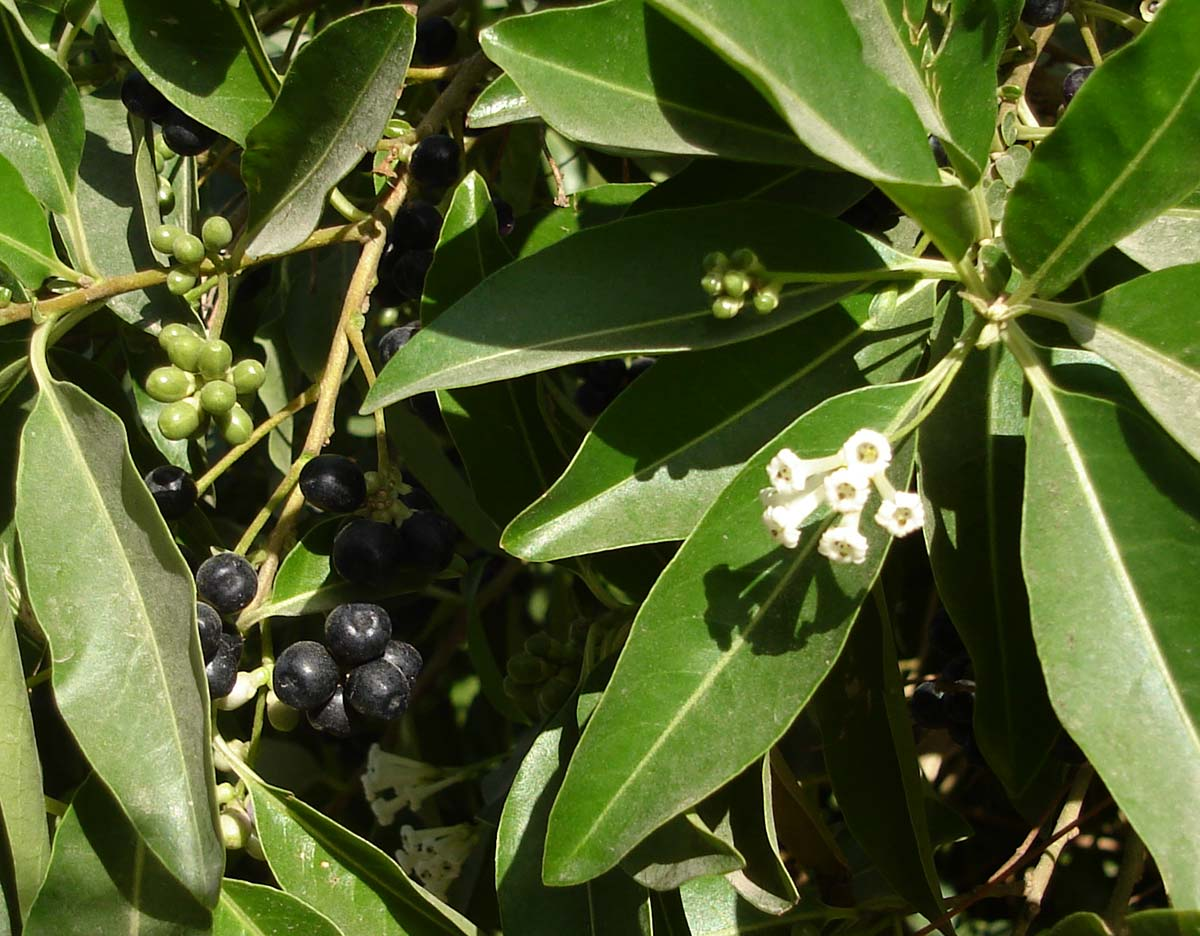

Scientific classification
- Kingdom: Plantae
- Clade: Tracheophytes
- Clade: Angiosperms
- Clade: Eudicots
- Clade: Asterids
- Order: Solanales
- Family: Solanaceae
- Genus: Cestrum
- Species: C. diurnum

Binomial name
- Cestrum diurnum L.

= Cestrum diurnum =

Species of flowering plant

Cestrum diurnum is a species of Cestrum, native to the West Indies. Common names include day-blooming cestrum, day-blooming jessamine, and day-blooming jasmine. Also known as Din ka Raja (king of the day), in Urdu and Hindi. The scent of this quick-growing and evergreen woody shrub, often used for screens and borders, is released by day. Cestrum diurnum is easily propagated from the seed, which it produces in abundance.

== Description ==
It is an erect evergreen woody shrub with numerous leafy branches. The branches, which are green and with well-marked white lenticels when young, fawn with age. The younger parts are covered with a very sparse glandular scruf.

The leaves are simple, glabrous, entire, alternate, ex-stipulate, ovate-lanceolate in shape with obtuse apex and obtusely wedge-shaped below. They are dark green above and pale below and are generally 5 inches long by 1.5 inches wide. The leaves are petiolate with petioles of 0.5 inch length.

The Inflorescence consists of a long axillary peduncle which bears short clusters of white sweet-smelling flowers, each cluster supported by a leaf-like bract. The individual flowers are sessile and may be with or without bracteoles.

Calyx is gamo-sepalous, about 0.15 in long, somewhat puberulent, obtusely 5-ribbed and 5-lobed with obtuse, ciliate lobes.

Corolla tube is narrowly infundibuliform, white, sweet-scented, about half-inch lobed with five lobes. The lobes are very obtuse and completely recurved when the flower is fully open.

Stamens oblong, five in number, alternate with the corolla lobes, brown in colour, included. Filaments adnate to the tube, free for a very short distance.

Ovary seated on a nectar-secreting disk. The style is filiform and glabrous. The stigmas are truncate-capitate.

Cestrum diurnum has a black, nearly globular berry.

== Distribution ==
A native of the West Indies, it is widely cultivated in gardens throughout India.

== Medicinal uses ==
Leaves of Cestrum diurnum are reported as a sources of vitamin D3. Aerial parts are also reported to have cytotoxic and thrombolytic activities.

== Toxicity ==
Cestrum diurnum is one of only three rangeland plants known to contain glycosides of the vitamin D metabolite 1,25-dihydroxycholecalciferol a.k.a. 1,25-OHD3. Consumption of glycosides of 1,25-OHD3 by grazing animals leads to a vitamin D toxicity resulting in calcinosis, the deposition of excessive calcium in soft tissues.
