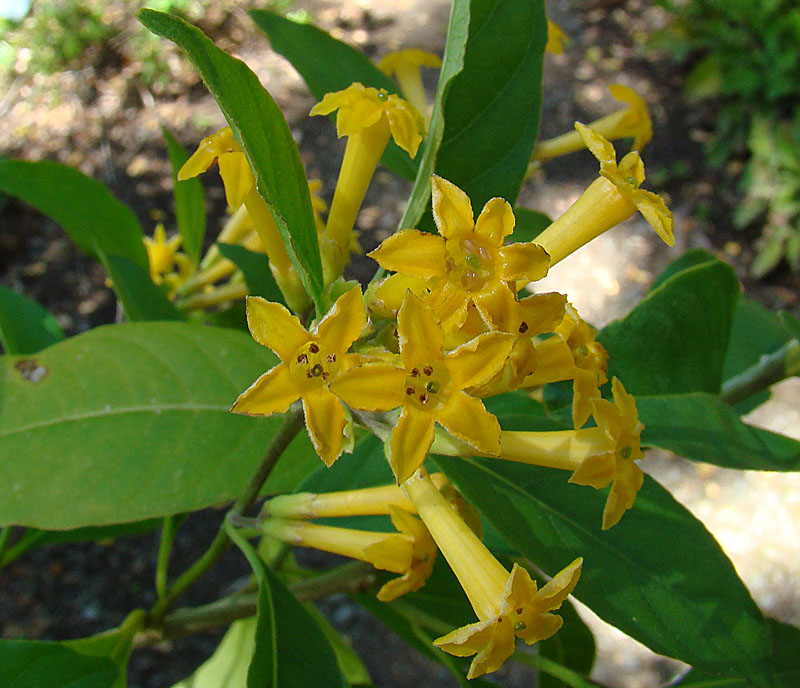

Scientific classification
- Kingdom: Plantae
- Clade: Tracheophytes
- Clade: Angiosperms
- Clade: Eudicots
- Clade: Asterids
- Order: Solanales
- Family: Solanaceae
- Genus: Cestrum
- Species: C. parqui

Binomial name
- Cestrum parqui L'Hér.

= Cestrum parqui =

Species of flowering plant

Cestrum parqui, commonly known as palqui, green cestrum, Chilean cestrum, green poisonberry, or willow-leaved jessamine, is a species of flowering plant native to Chile.

In cultivation in the United Kingdom this plant has gained the Royal Horticultural Society's Award of Garden Merit (confirmed 2017). In Australia, the plant is regarded as an invasive species.

== Description ==
C. parqui is a fast-growing, straggling, woody, semi-evergreen shrub that grows to over 3 metres in height (or more in warmer areas) with one or a few fragile green stems. Leaves are alternate, light green in colour, lance-shaped or marginally elliptic (that are wide at the middle), narrowly tapered at both ends, mainly 30–65 mm long and 8–23 mm wide. They have an unpleasant rubber-like smell when crushed. In areas with cool winters, the plant is partly deciduous.

=== Inflorescences ===
It produces terminal sprays of small, pungent-scented, tubular yellow-green flowers 2.5 cm long, followed by bunches of small, black, egg-shaped berries produced from summer to autumn. All parts of the plant are reported to be highly toxic. Whilst the flower colors are generally yellow-green, some varieties have mustard orange, creamy white, golden yellow and reddish-orange colors.

The flowers have an unpleasant odor during the day, but are fragrant (sweet-scented) at night. The plant flowers throughout the year (particularly in warmer climates), more so from spring to autumn, but the blooming is more prolific during spring.

The small, black fruits of Cestrum parqui are highly attractive to birds, which play a major role in seed dispersal, passing the seeds in their droppings: seedlings are thus often found growing under perching trees, along fencelines, and in creek banks, where it is also dispersed by water.

== Uses ==
=== Medicinal ===
The plant contains toxic alkaloids. It has been used in folk medicine to treat tumours and haemorrhoids and possesses sudorific (perspiration-inducing), laxative and antispasmodic properties. Decoctions or infusions of the plant have also been administered in cases of intermittent fever and an infusion of the inner bark drunk to treat unspecified "stomach ailments".

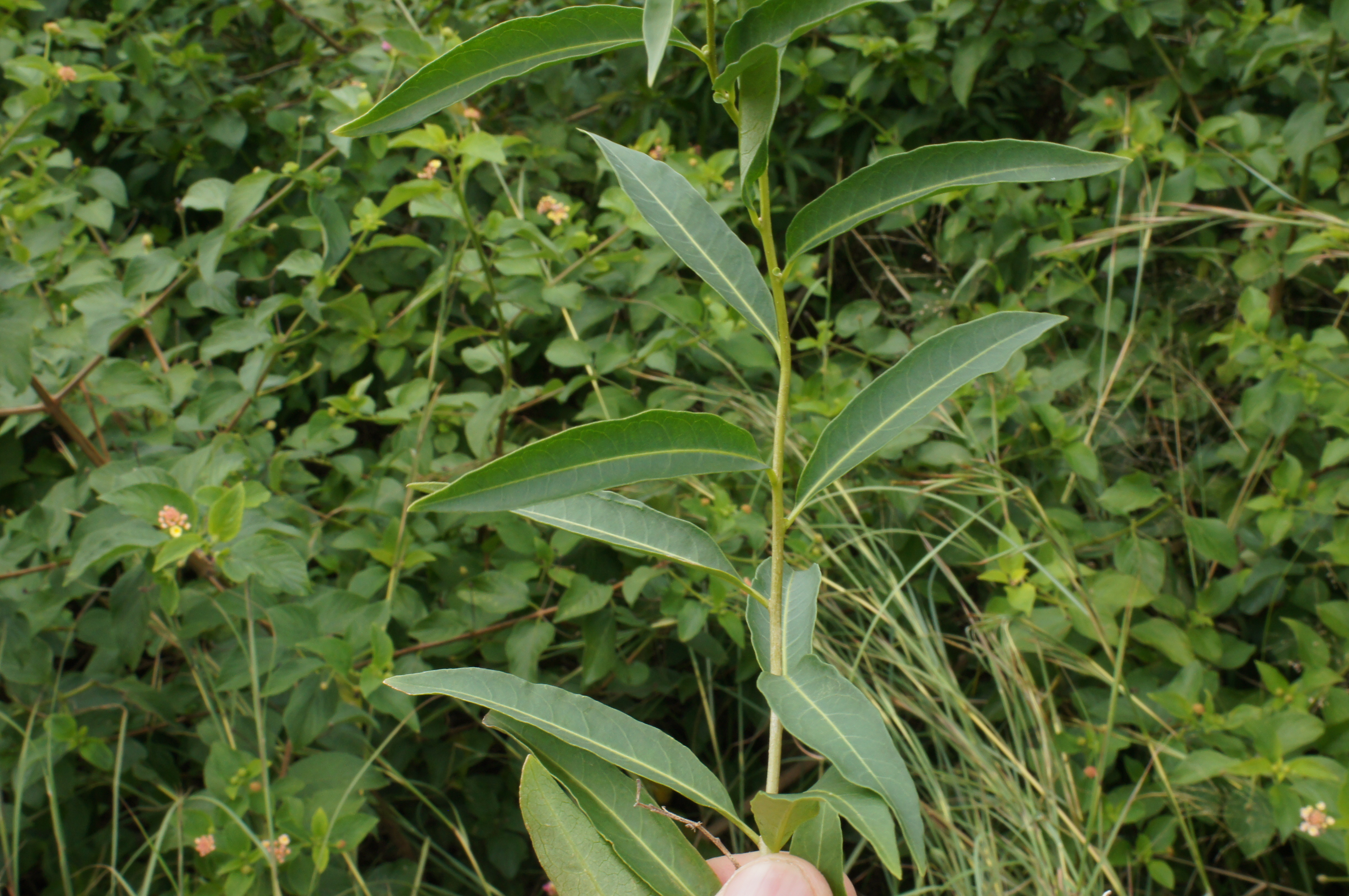
Stem and leaves of C. parqui

A poultice prepared from the plant (part unspecified) in combination with Solanum nigrum (part unspecified) and the crushed stems of Vitis vinifera, the grape vine, is believed in folk medicine to have anti-inflammatory properties. A crude extract of its aerial parts in methanol water displayed inhibition of carrageenin-induced oedema.

=== Tobacco substitute ===
Carl Hartwich, in his monumental work of 1911 on recreational drugs Die Menschlichen Genussmittel... ('The Pleasure Drugs of Humankind...'), records the following:

On the island of Chiloe, when there is a lack of tobacco, the Cholos Indians replace it with another Solanacea Palguin or Palquin, which they apparently smoked before the first [i.e. tobacco derived from various Nicotiana species] became known. The plant, Cestrum parqui L'Her., a small tree with lanceolate leaves and yellowish-white flowers, appears to be widespread in South America, it is found throughout Chile and the southern states of Brazil. In Chile they say of a well-known person: 'He is as famous as Palqui'. The leaves (which are toxic to cattle) and the wood are used medicinally. I was able to detect a trace of alkaloid in the latter. [translated from the original German]

=== Ritualistic ===
Branches of Cestrum parqui are used to slap patients during shamanic healing ceremonies that utilize the hallucinogenic and anticholinergic plant Latua pubiflora, which are performed by the indigenous Huilliche people of the Los Lagos Region of southern Chile. This is due to the belief that the foul smell of the Cestrum plant is abhorrent to the demons believed to be causing the patient's illness and will cause them to leave the patient's body via vomiting.

== Invasiveness ==
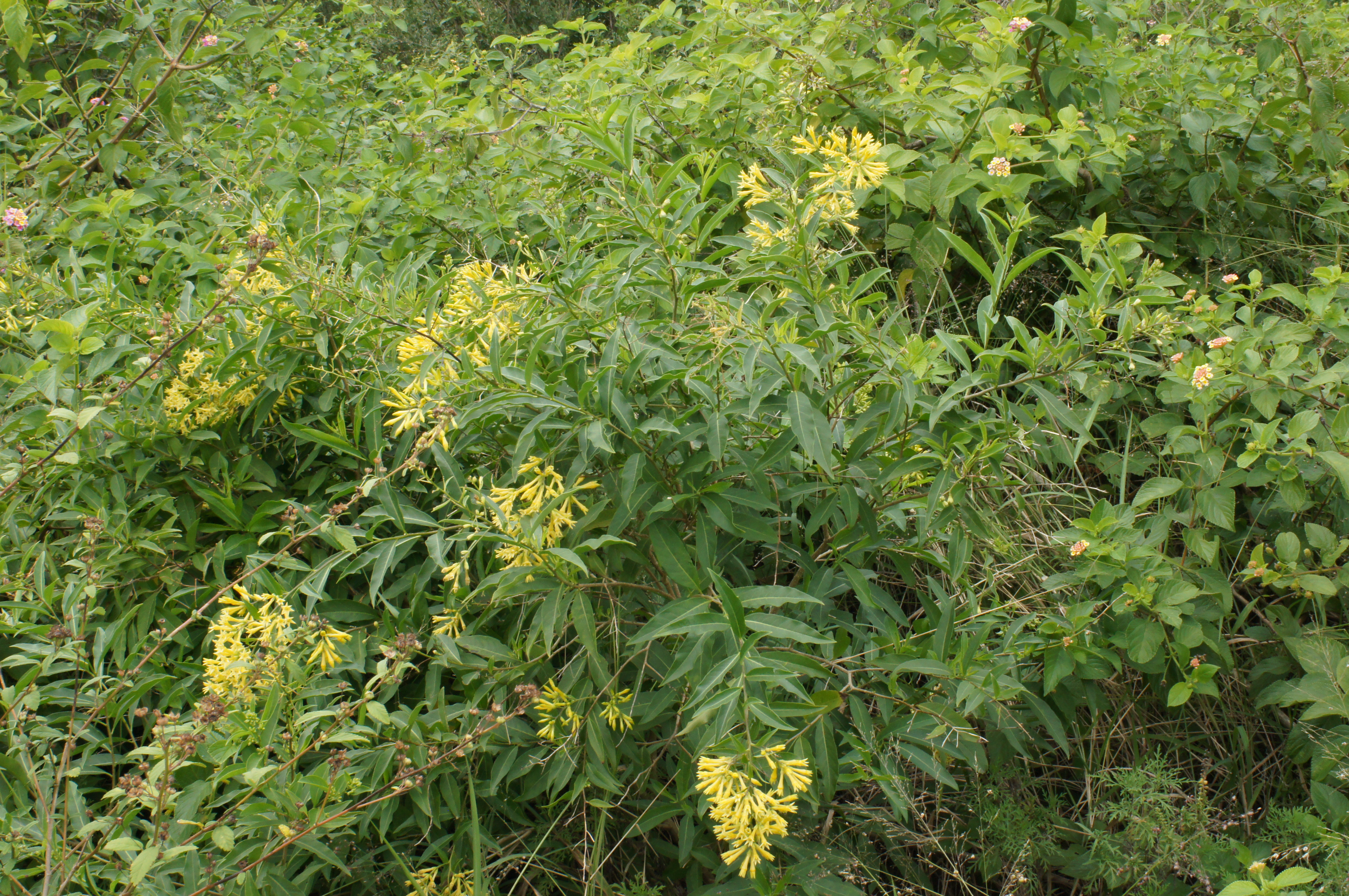
Plant growing as a weed near Newcastle, Southeastern Australia

Because of its easy dispersal, it is considered to be a noxious weed in Australia, where it is even prohibited for merchandising in New South Wales, as it is a significant hazard to livestock (especially cattle) which may eat it inadvertently or during shortages of other foods, often resulting in death. Although it is no longer a fashionable garden plant and is now a garden escape, it may still be found in old gardens.

It was introduced as an ornamental plant and was naturalized in Australia in the 1920s, where it was recorded in the Brisbane Botanic Gardens in 1924 and naturalised at Ashgrove in 1926. By 1928, the species was blamed for livestock deaths in Brisbane's southern suburbs. Therefore, in 1933, it was declared a noxious weed in Queensland, whilst simultaneously becoming established in New South Wales. Cattle fatalities continued in the states of QLD and NSW throughout the 1940s and 1950s. It became naturalized in Victoria in the early 1940s, where it was observed in the Yarra and Dandenong Ranges in 1980, although the species is relatively rare in that state.

== Gallery ==
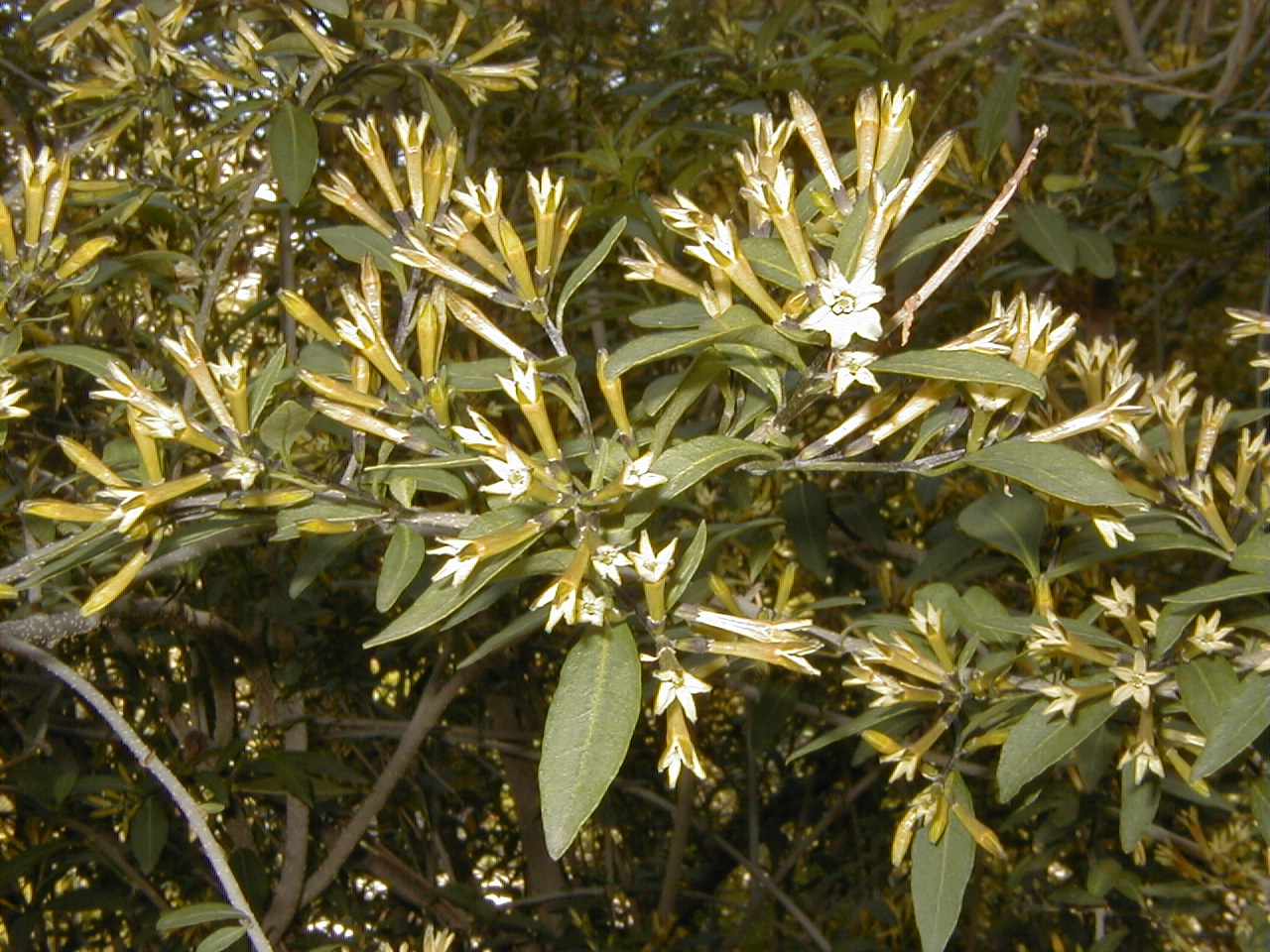
Specimen flowering in Royal Botanic Garden, Madrid

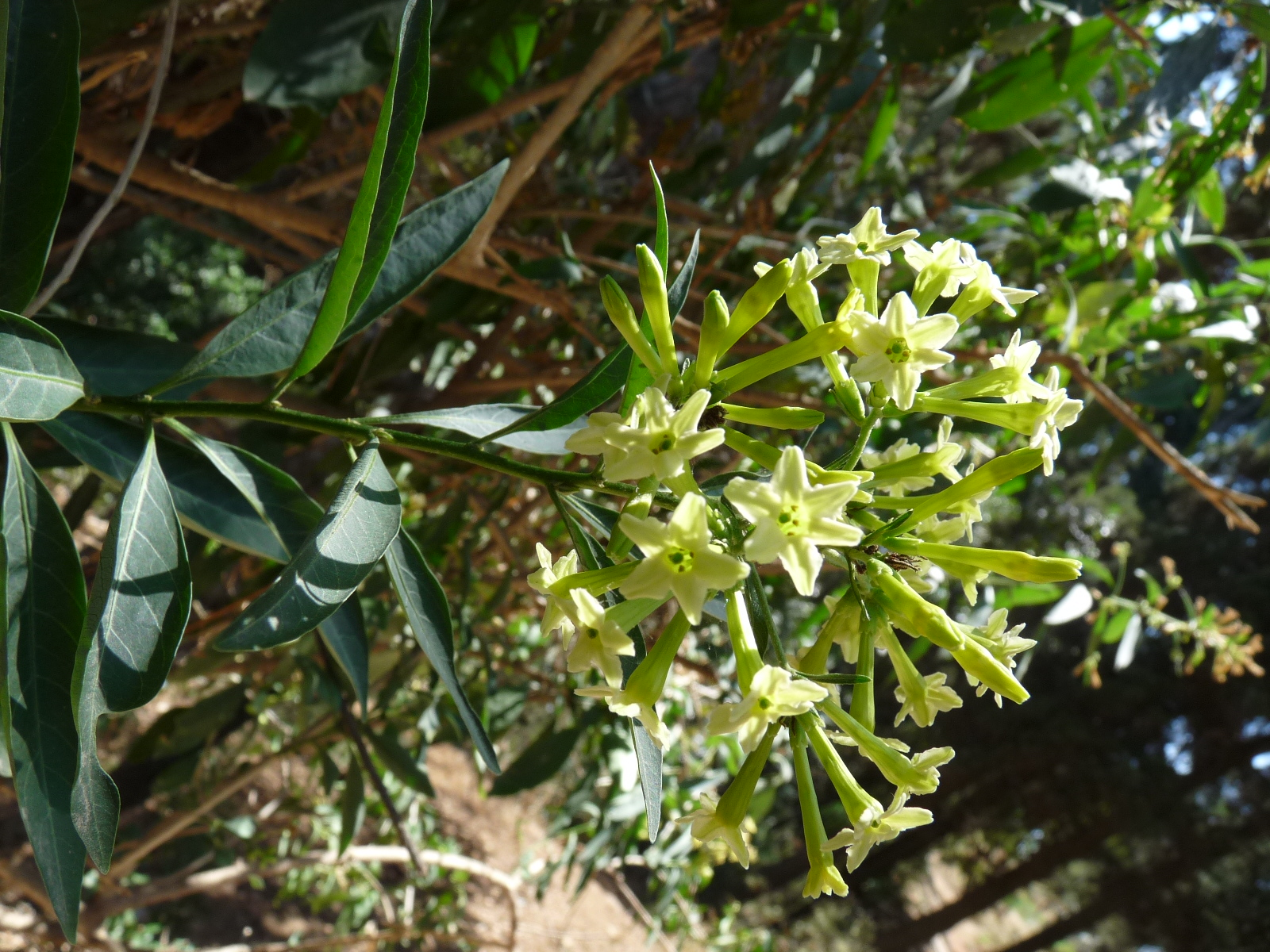
Close-up of willow-like leaves and greenish flowers

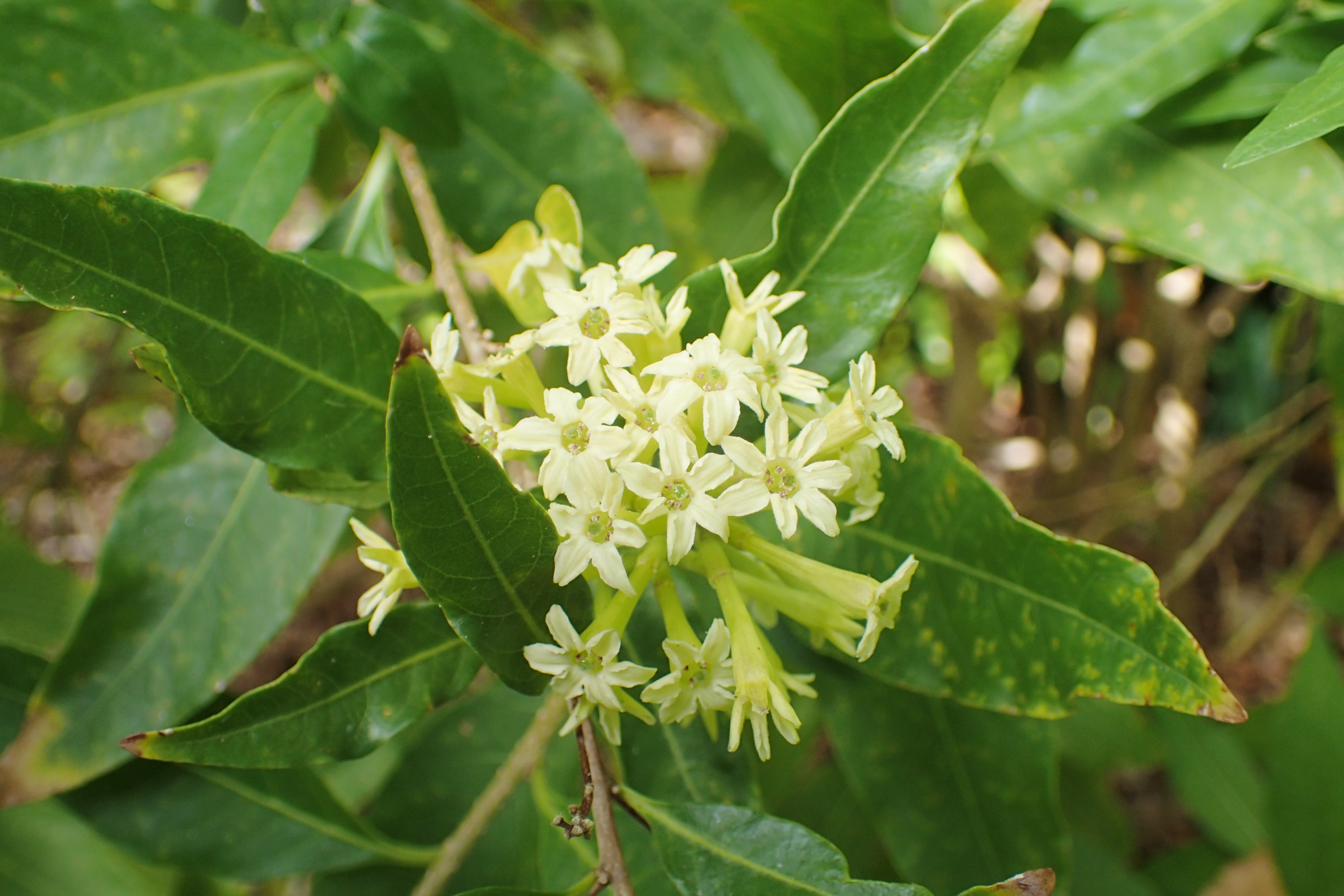
Flowers

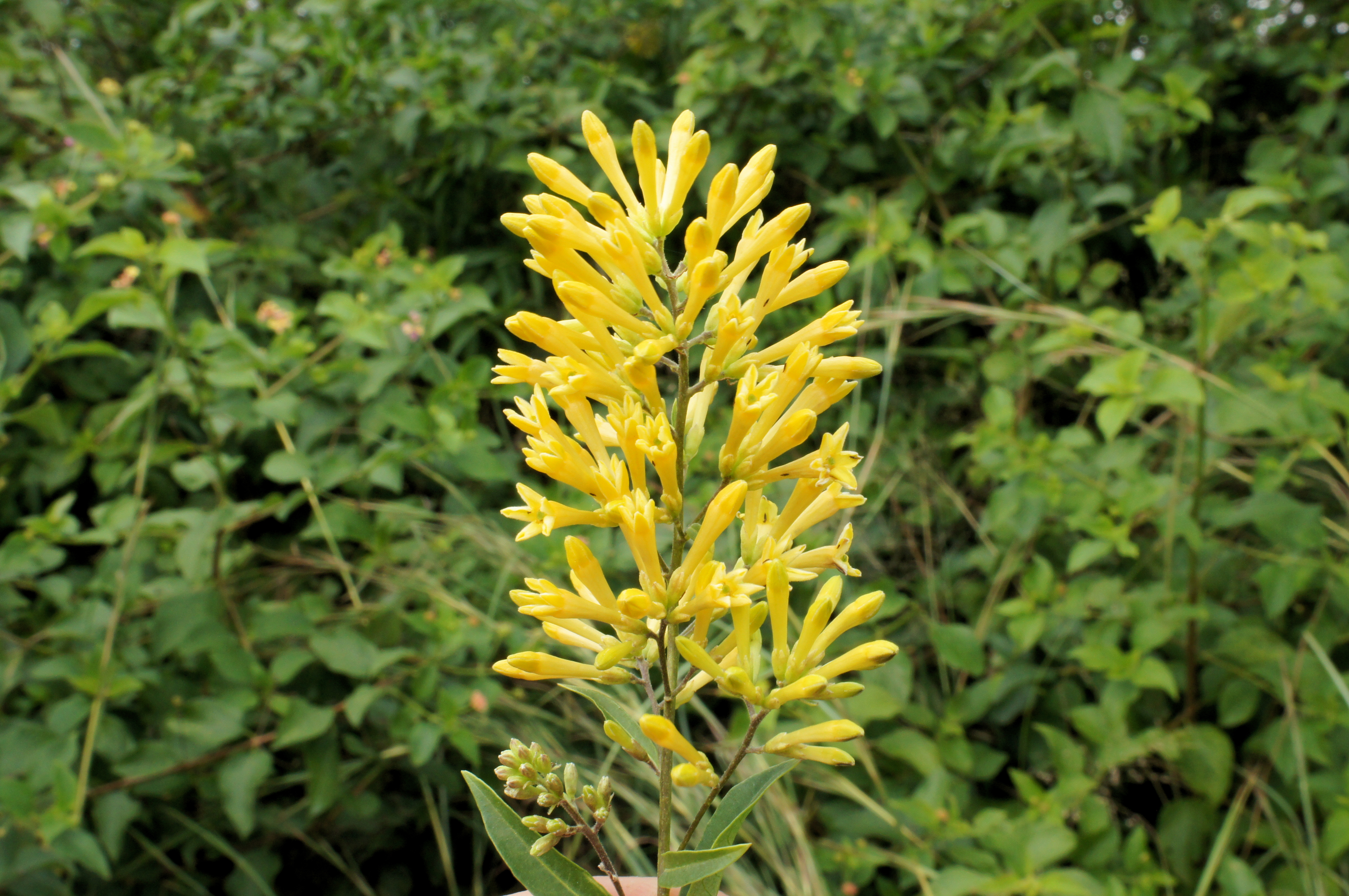
Flowerhead

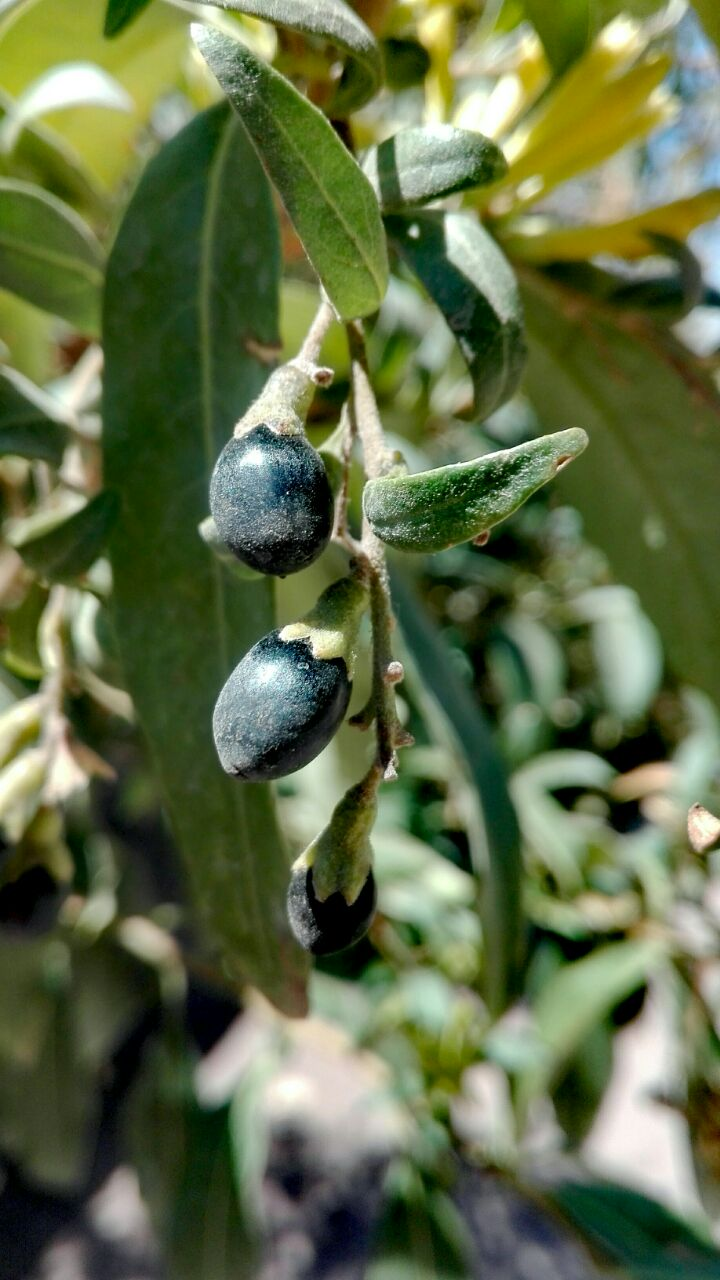
Black fruit

== See also ==
- List of plants poisonous to equines
