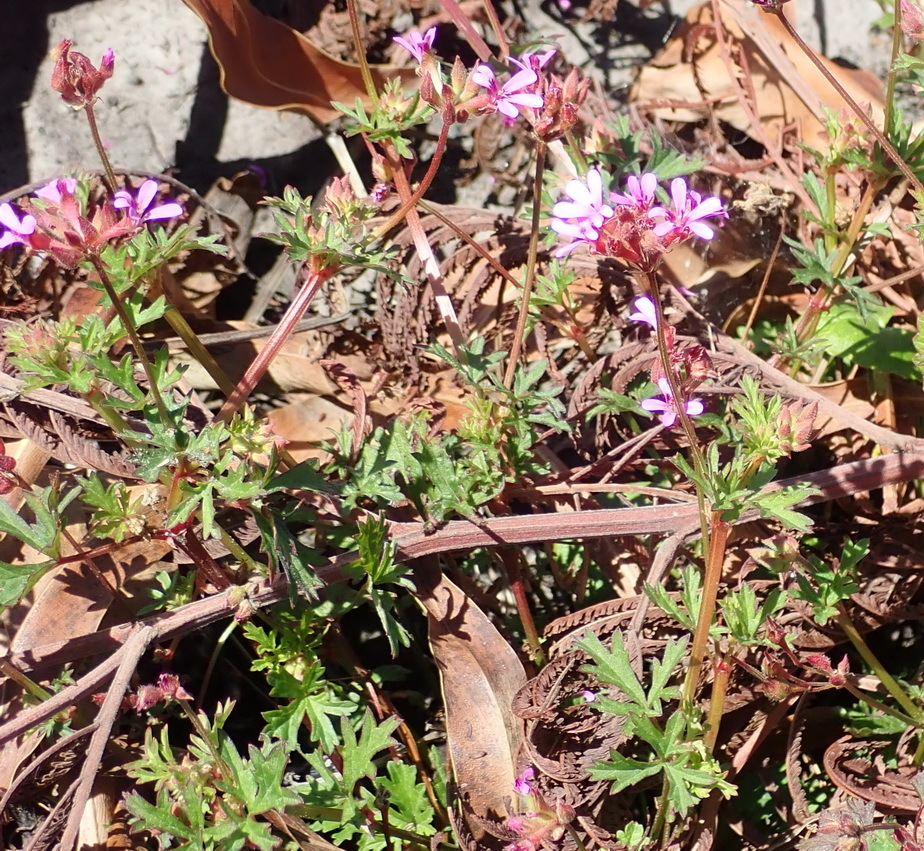

Scientific classification
- Kingdom: Plantae
- Clade: Tracheophytes
- Clade: Angiosperms
- Clade: Eudicots
- Clade: Rosids
- Order: Geraniales
- Family: Geraniaceae
- Genus: Pelargonium
- Species: P. grossularioides

Binomial name
- Pelargonium grossularioides (L.) L'Hér. ex Aiton

= Pelargonium grossularioides =

Species of flowering plant

Pelargonium grossularioides is a species of geranium known by the common names gooseberry geranium and coconut geranium. It grows primarily in the subtropical biome and is native to Cape Provinces, Free State (province), KwaZulu-Natal, Mozambique, and Tristan da Cunha. It is known in coastal California, Kenya, and parts of India as an introduced species. It is sometimes grown as a garden geranium.

Its common names come from the resemblance of the leaves to those of gooseberry and from the coconut scent of the leaves.

An annual or occasionally perennial, it has sparse, short hairs and a prostrate or sprawling habit. The leaves are round to broadly ovate, lobed, with the edges coarsely toothed. The inflorescence is an umbel of 3 to 50 flowers in pink to rose-purple. Each flower has five narrow petals no more than 6 millimeters long.
