= Pelargonin =

Names
- IUPAC name 7-Hydroxy-2-(4-hydroxyphenyl)-3,5-bis{[(2S,3R,4S,5S,6R)-3,4,5-trihydroxy-6-(hydroxymethyl)oxan-2-yl]oxy}-1λ^{4}-benzopyran-1-ylium
- Other names Pelargonidin 3,5-di-β-D-glucoside

Identifiers
CAS Number	17334-58-6
3D model (JSmol)	Interactive image
ChEBI	CHEBI:133365
ChemSpider	390369
ECHA InfoCard	100.037.584
KEGG	C08725
PubChem CID	441772
UNII	4OJV6238UJ
CompTox Dashboard (EPA)	DTXSID00938359
- InChI: InChI=1S/C27H30O15/c28-8-17-19(32)21(34)23(36)26(41-17)39-15-6-12(31)5-14-13(15)7-16(25(38-14)10-1-3-11(30)4-2-10)40-27-24(37)22(35)20(33)18(9-29)42-27/h1-7,17-24,26-29,32-37H,8-9H2,(H-,30,31)/p+1/t17-,18-,19-,20-,21+,22+,23-,24-,26-,27-/m1/s1 Key: SLCKJKWFULXZBD-ZOTFFYTFSA-O; InChI=1/C27H30O15/c28-8-17-19(32)21(34)23(36)26(41-17)39-15-6-12(31)5-14-13(15)7-16(25(38-14)10-1-3-11(30)4-2-10)40-27-24(37)22(35)20(33)18(9-29)42-27/h1-7,17-24,26-29,32-37H,8-9H2,(H-,30,31)/p+1/t17-,18-,19-,20-,21+,22+,23-,24-,26-,27-/m1/s1 Key: SLCKJKWFULXZBD-OJOSBQBKBL
- SMILES: c1cc(ccc1c2c(cc3c([o+]2)cc(cc3O[C@H]4[C@@H]([C@H]([C@@H]([C@H](O4)CO)O)O)O)O)O[C@H]5[C@@H]([C@H]([C@@H]([C@H](O5)CO)O)O)O)O

Properties
Chemical formula	C_{27}H_{31}O_{15}^{+}
Molar mass	595.53 g/mol
- Except where otherwise noted, data are given for materials in their standard state (at 25 °C [77 °F], 100 kPa). Infobox references

Pelargonin is an anthocyanin. It is the 3,5-O-diglucoside of pelargonidin.

== Natural occurrences ==
Pelargonin is a pigment, found in barberries, the petals of the scarlet pelargonium flower pomegranates, and red wine.

== See also ==
- Phenolic content in wine
