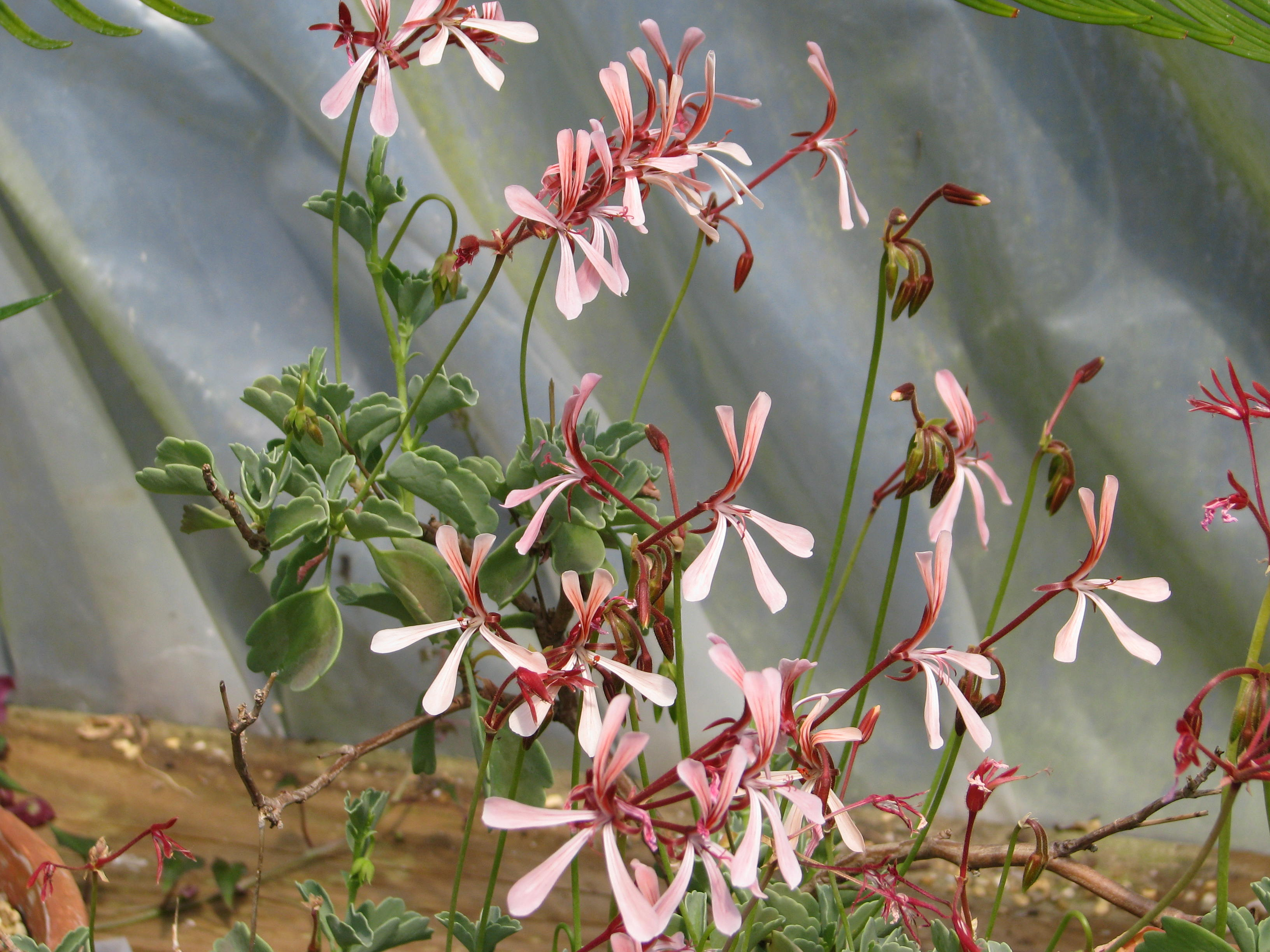
- Flowers
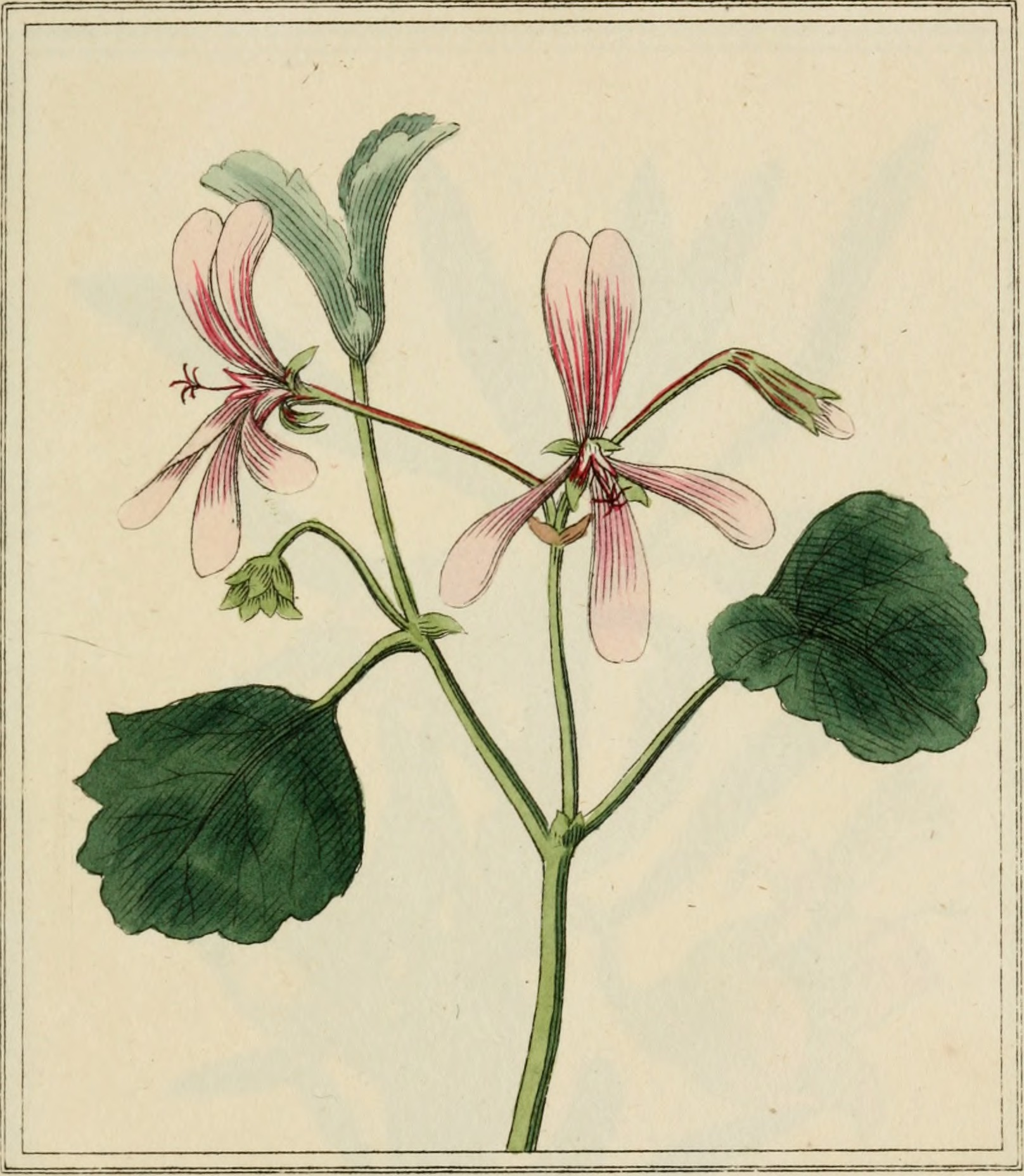
- Botanical illustration

Scientific classification
- Kingdom: Plantae
- Clade: Tracheophytes
- Clade: Angiosperms
- Clade: Eudicots
- Clade: Rosids
- Order: Geraniales
- Family: Geraniaceae
- Genus: Pelargonium
- Species: P. acetosum

Binomial name
- Pelargonium acetosum (L.) L'Hér.

Synonyms
- Ciconium acetosum (L.) Hoffmanns.; Geraniospermum acetosum (L.) Kuntze; Geranium acetosum L.

= Pelargonium acetosum =

Species of plant

Pelargonium acetosum, the sorrel cranesbill or sorrel-leaved pelargonium, is a species of flowering plant in the family Geraniaceae, native to the eastern Cape Provinces of South Africa. A perennial reaching 60 cm (24 in) with salmon‑pink flowers, it is available from commercial suppliers. The sour‑tasting young leaves are eaten in South Africa in a manner similar to sorrel (Rumex acetosa).
