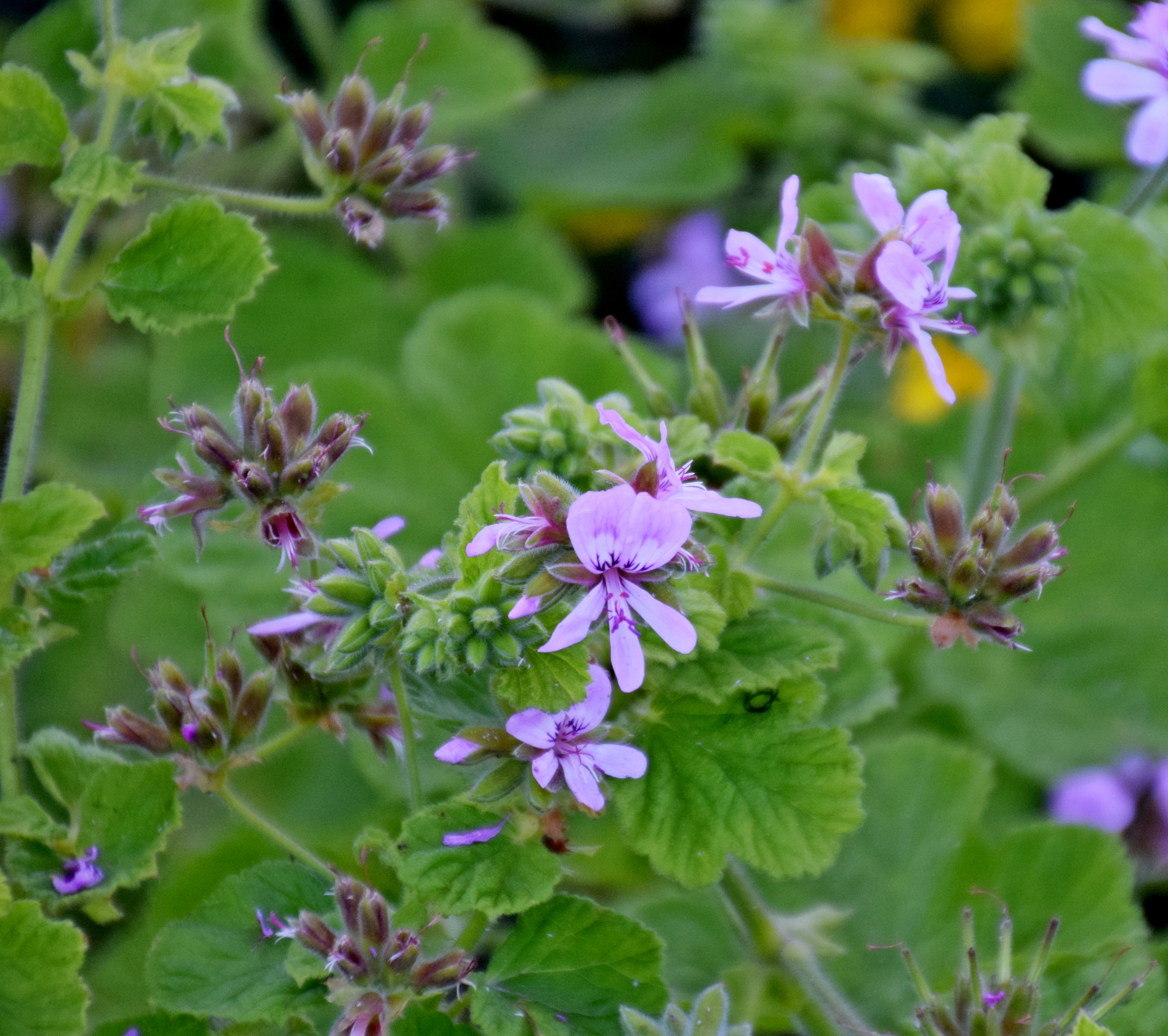
- Pelargonium vitifolium in Dunedin Botanic Garden, Dunedin, New Zealand.

Scientific classification
- Kingdom: Plantae
- Clade: Tracheophytes
- Clade: Angiosperms
- Clade: Eudicots
- Clade: Rosids
- Order: Geraniales
- Family: Geraniaceae
- Genus: Pelargonium
- Species: P. vitifolium

Binomial name
- Pelargonium vitifolium (L.) L'Hér. (1789)

Synonyms
- Geraniospermum vitifolium (L.) Kuntze (1891); Geranium vitifolium L. (1753)

= Pelargonium vitifolium =

Species of flowering plant

Pelargonium vitifolium is a species of geranium known by the common name grapeleaf geranium. It is a shrub endemic to the Cape Provinces of South Africa. it is a commonly grown ornamental plant. This is a mostly erect, branching shrub approaching one meter in maximum height. The stems are soft and coated in soft hairs when young and become more woody with age. The glandular, stiffly-hairy aromatic leaves are about 6 centimeters long and 8 wide, divided into 5 or 7 toothed, heart-shaped lobes. The inflorescence is a dense umbel of several flowers with five petals each around a centimeter long. The flowers are pink with purplish markings.
