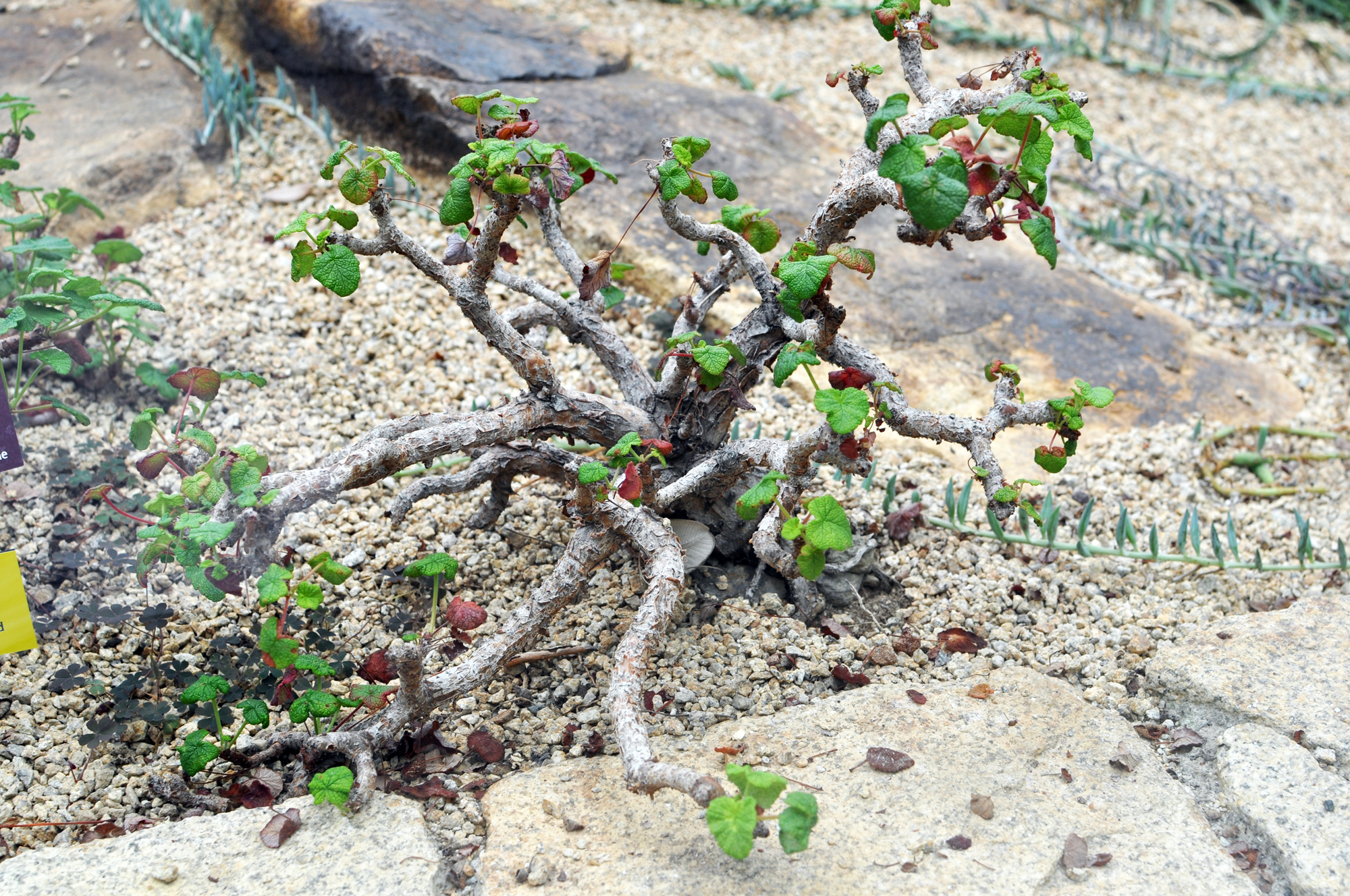

Conservation status
- Critically Endangered (IUCN 3.1)

Scientific classification
- Kingdom: Plantae
- Clade: Embryophytes
- Clade: Tracheophytes
- Clade: Spermatophytes
- Clade: Angiosperms
- Clade: Eudicots
- Clade: Rosids
- Order: Geraniales
- Family: Geraniaceae
- Genus: Pelargonium
- Species: P. cotyledonis

Binomial name
- Pelargonium cotyledonis (L.) L'Hér.

Synonyms
- Erodium sempervivum Roxb.; Geranium cotyledonis L. (1771); Isopetalum cotyledonis (L.) Sweet; Pelargonium cotyledonifolium Salisb., nom. illeg. superfl.; Pelargonium cotyledon G.Don

= Pelargonium cotyledonis =

Species of flowering plant

Pelargonium cotyledonis (local name old father live forever) is an endemic species of plant on the island of Saint Helena in the South Atlantic Ocean. It is a white flowered, deciduous succulent plant, and is considered endangered.
