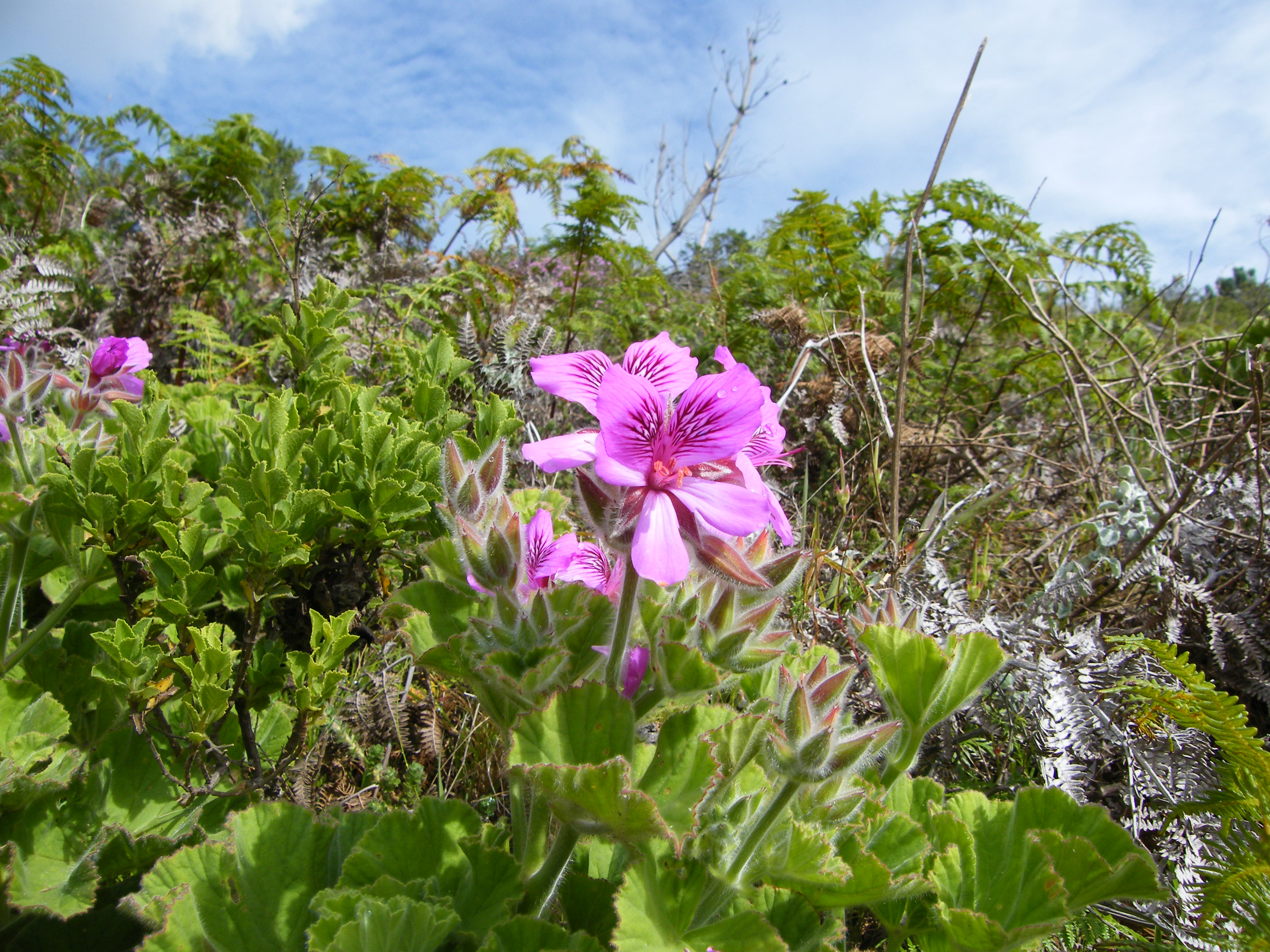
- Pelargonium cucullatum

Scientific classification
- Kingdom: Plantae
- Clade: Embryophytes
- Clade: Tracheophytes
- Clade: Spermatophytes
- Clade: Angiosperms
- Clade: Eudicots
- Clade: Rosids
- Order: Geraniales
- Family: Geraniaceae
- Genus: Pelargonium; L'Hér. (Note: The generic description of Pelargonium in Hortus Kewensis was copied from L’Heritier’s unpublished manuscript titled Compendium Generalogium)

Type species
- Pelargonium hirsutum (Burm. f.) Sol. ex Aiton; Pelargonium cucullatum (Note: It has been stated that the choice of P. hirsutum was made arbitrarily, and that Pelargonium cucullatum (L.) Aiton, designated by van der Walt should be the lectotype species. Furthermore, P. hirsutum is not currently recognised as an accepted name.) (L.) Aiton

Subgenera
- Magnipetala; Parvulipetala; Paucisignata; Pelargonium

Diversity
- Around 280 species

= Pelargonium =

Genus of plants

Pelargonium (/ˌpɛlɑːrˈɡoʊni.əm/) is a genus of flowering plants commonly called geraniums, pelargoniums, or storksbills. It includes about 280 species of perennials, succulents, and shrubs. Taxonomist Carl Linnaeus originally included all the species of Pelargonium and Geranium under the latter name. In 1789, Charles Louis L'Héritier de Brutelle separated them into two genera.

While Geranium species are mostly temperate herbaceous plants, dying down in winter, Pelargonium species are evergreen perennials indigenous to warm temperate and tropical regions of the world, with many species in southern Africa. They are drought and heat tolerant but can tolerate only minor frosts. Some species are extremely popular garden plants, grown as houseplants and bedding plants in temperate regions. They have a long flowering period, with flowers mostly in red, orange, or white, but intensive breeding has produced a huge array of cultivars with great variety in size, flower colour, leaf form and aromatic foliage.

== Description ==
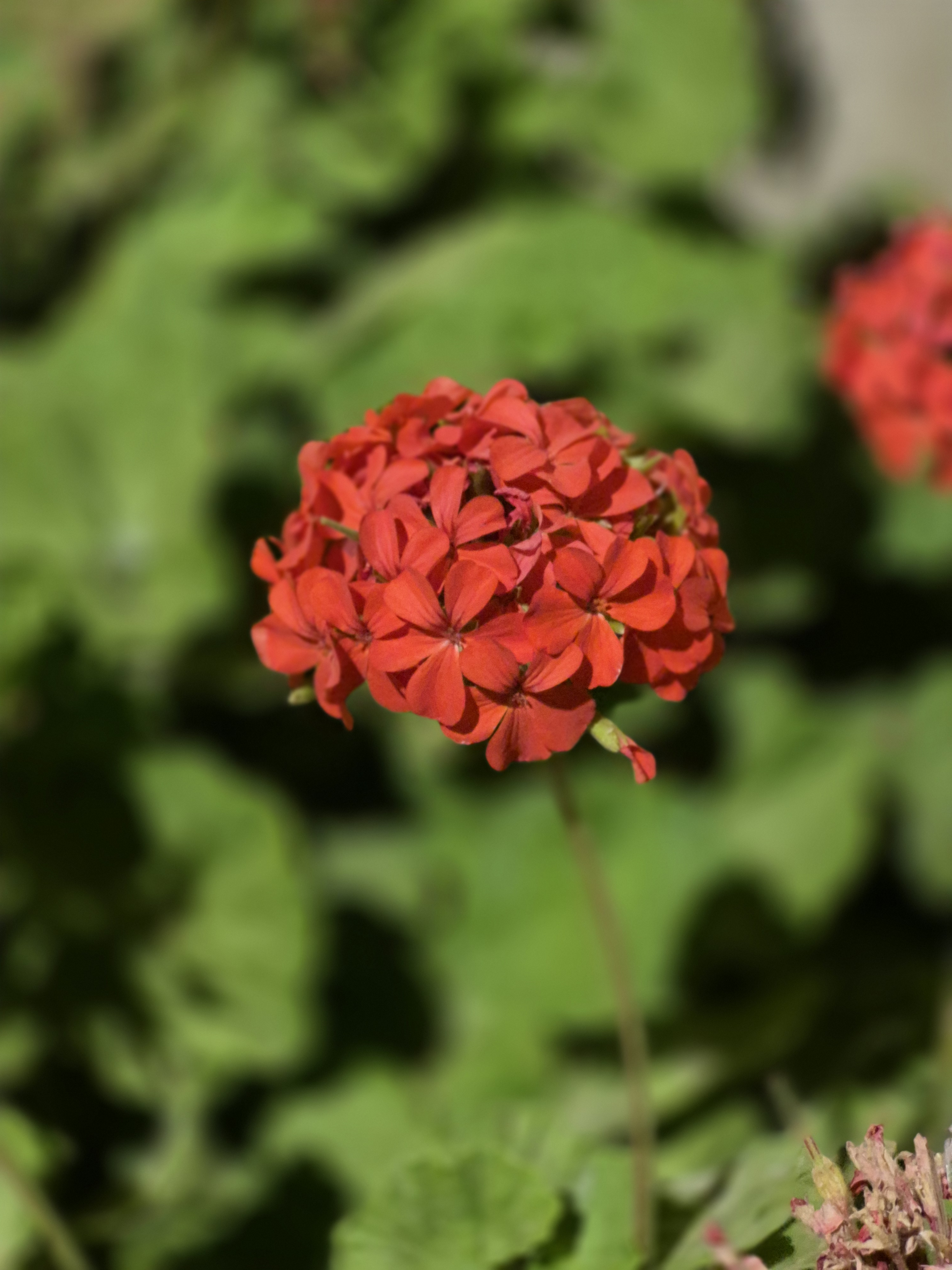
Pelargonium sp., probably a hybrid

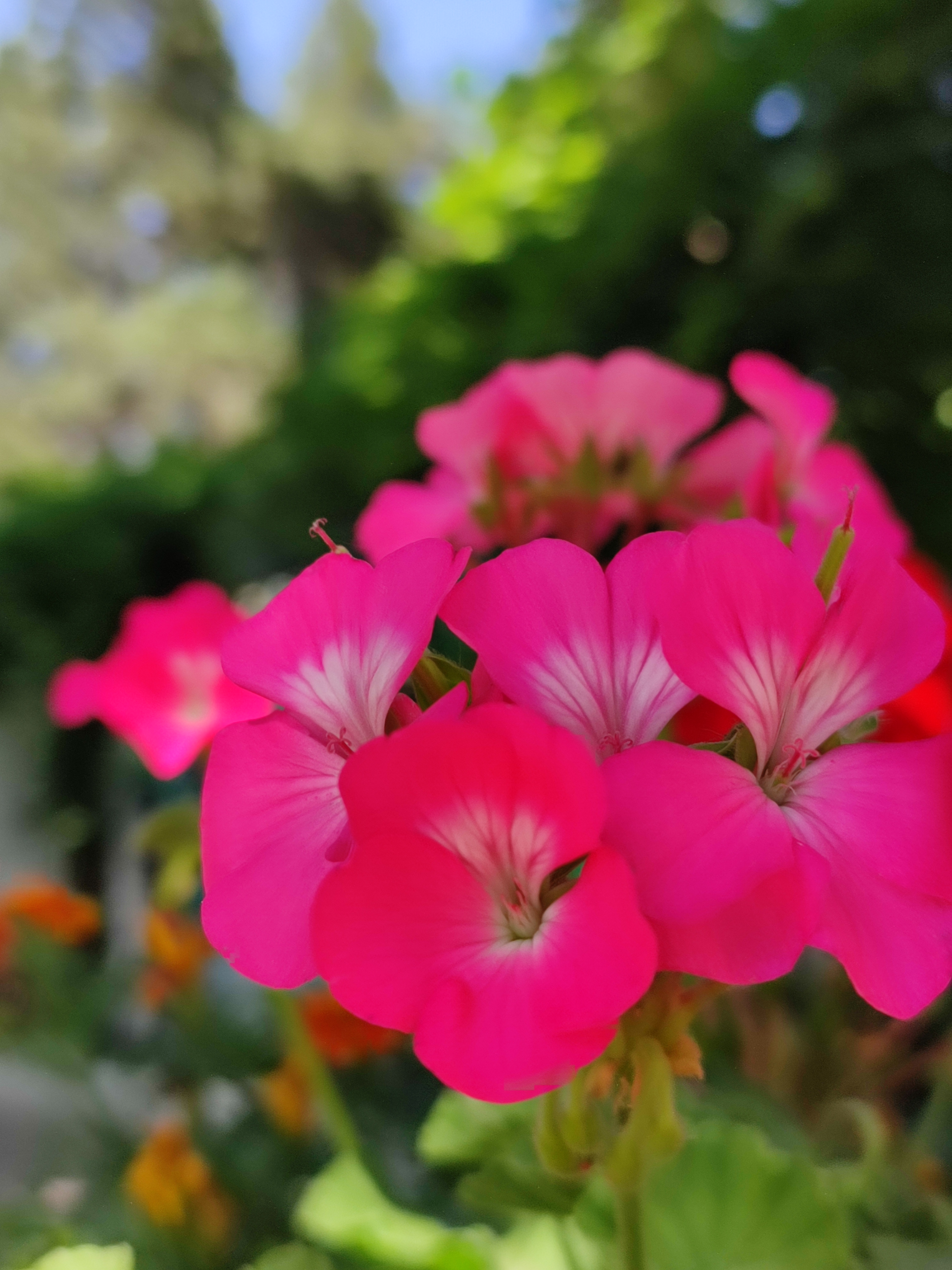
Pelargonium flower

Pelargonium occurs in a large number of growth forms, including herbaceous annuals, shrubs, subshrubs, stem succulents and geophytes. The erect stems bear five-petaled flowers in umbel-like clusters, which are occasionally branched. Because not all flowers appear simultaneously, but open from the centre outwards, this is a form of inflorescence is referred to as pseudoumbels.

The flower has a single symmetry plane (zygomorphic), which distinguishes it from the Geranium flower, which has radial symmetry (actinomorphic). Thus the lower three (anterior) petals are differentiated from the upper two (posterior) petals. The posterior sepal is fused with the pedicel to form a hypanthium (nectary tube). The nectary tube varies from only a few millimeters, up to several centimeters, and is an important floral characteristic in morphological classification. Stamens vary from 2 to 7, and their number, position relative to staminodes, and curvature are used to identify individual species. There are five stigmata in the style. For the considerable diversity in flower morphology, see figure 1 of Röschenbleck et al. (2014).

Leaves are usually alternate, and palmately lobed or pinnate, often on long stalks, and sometimes with light or dark patterns. The leaves of Pelargonium peltatum (Ivy-leaved Geranium), have a thick cuticle better adapting them for drought tolerance.

== Taxonomy ==
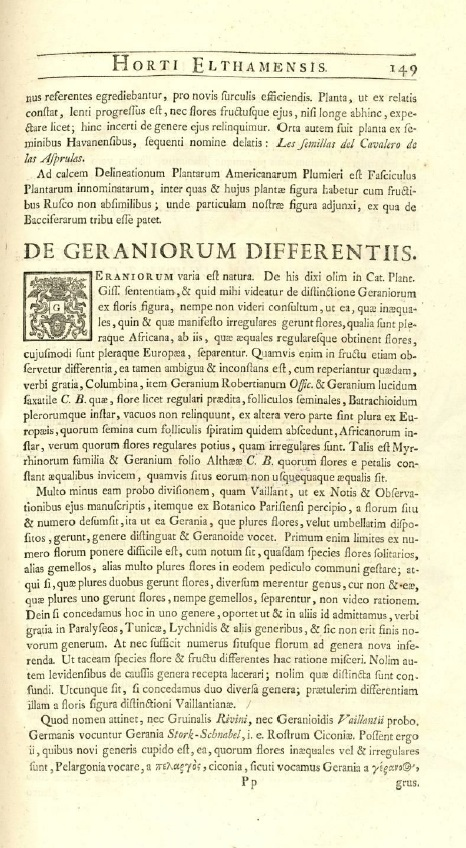
Dillenius' introduction of the term 'Pelargonium' in Hortus Elthamensis 1732

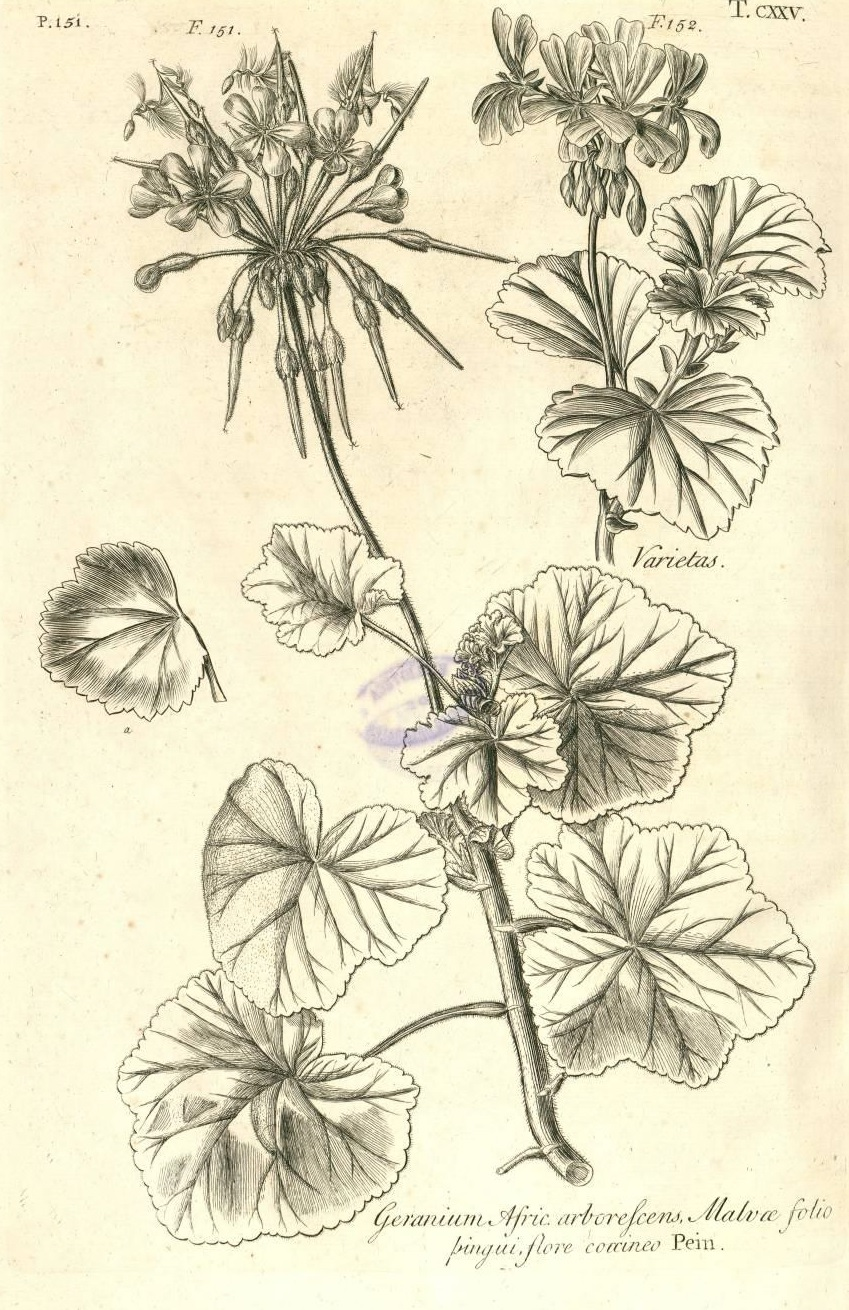
Pelargonium inquinans, (Geranium Afric. arborescens), Hortus Elthamensis

Pelargonium is the second largest genus (after Geranium) within the family Geraniaceae, within which it is sister to the remaining genera of the family in its strict sense, Erodium, Geranium, and Monsonia including Sarcocaulon. The Geraniaceae have a number of genetic features unique amongst angiosperms, including highly rearranged plastid genomes differing in gene content, order and expansion of the inverted repeat.

=== Genus history ===
The name Pelargonium was first proposed by Dillenius in 1732, who described and illustrated seven species of geraniums from South Africa that are now classified as Pelargonium. Dillenius, who referred to these seven species with apparent unique characteristics as Geranium Africanum (African Geranium) suggested "Possent ergo ii, quibus novi generis cupido est, ea, quorum flores inaequales vel et irrregulares sunt, Pelargonia vocare" (Those who wish a new genus can therefore call those, whose flowers are unequal or irregular, ‘Pelargonia’). The name was then formally introduced by Johannes Burman in 1738. However Carl Linnaeus who first formally described these plants in 1753 did not recognise Pelargonium and grouped together in the same genus (Geranium) the three similar genera Erodium, Geranium, and Pelargonium. Linnaeus' reputation prevented further differentiation for forty years. The eventual distinction between them was made by Charles L’Héritier based on the number of stamens or anthers, seven in the case of Pelargonium. In 1774, P. cordatum, P. crispum, P. quercifolium and P. radula were introduced, followed by P. capitatum in 1790.

=== Circumscription ===
Pelargonium is distinguished from the other genera in the family Geraniaceae by the presence of a hypanthium, which consists of an adnate nectar spur with one nectary, as well as a generally zygomorphic floral symmetry.

=== Subdivision ===
De Candolle first proposed dividing the genus into 12 sections in 1824, based on the diversity of growth forms. Traditionally the large number of Pelargonium species have been treated as sixteen sections, based on the classification of Knuth (1912) who described 15 sections, as modified by van der Walt et al. (1977–1997) who added Chorisma, Reniformia and Subsucculentia.

These are as follows;

- section Campylia (Lindley ex Sweet) de Candolle
- section Chorisma (Lindley ex Sweet) de Candolle
- section Ciconium (Sweet) Harvey
- section Cortusina (DC.) Harvey
- section Glaucophyllum Harvey
- section Hoarea (Sweet) de Candolle
- section Isopetalum (Sweet) de Candolle
- section Jenkinsonia (Sweet) de Candolle
- section Ligularia (Sweet) Harvey
- section Myrrhidium de Candolle
- section Otidia (Lindley ex Sweet) de Candolle
- section Pelargonium (Sweet) Harvey
- section Peristera de Candolle
- section Polyactium de Candolle
- section Reniformia (Knuth) Dreyer
- section Subsucculentia J.J.A. van der Walt

=== Phylogenetic analyses ===
All subdivision classifications had depended primarily on morphological differences till the era of phylogenetic analyses (Price and Palmer 1993). However phylogenetic analysis shows only three distinct clades, labelled A, B and C. In this analysis not all sections were monophyletic, although some were strongly supported including Chorisma, Myrrhidium and Jenkinsonia, while other sections were more paraphyletic. This in turn has led to a proposal, informal at this stage, of a reformulation of the infrageneric subdivision of Pelargonium.

In the proposed scheme of Weng et al. there would be two subgenera, based on clades A+B, and C respectively and seven sections based on subclades. Subsequent analysis with an expanded taxa set confirmed this infrageneric subdivision into two groups which also correspond to chromosome length (<1.5 μ, 1.5-3.0μ), but also two subclades within each major clade, suggesting the presence of four subgenera, these correspond to clades A, B, C1 and C2 of the earlier analysis, A being by far the largest clade with 141 taxa. As before the internal structure of the clades supported monophyly of some sections (Myrrhidium, Chorisma, Reniformia, Pelargonium, Ligularia and Hoarea) but paraphyly in others (Jenkinsonia, Ciconium, Peristera). A distinct clade could be identified within the paraphyletic Polyactium, designated section Magnistipulacea. As a result, Polyactium has been split up to provide this new section, which in itself contains two subsections, Magnistipulacea and Schizopetala, following Knuth's original treatment of Polyactium as having four subsections.

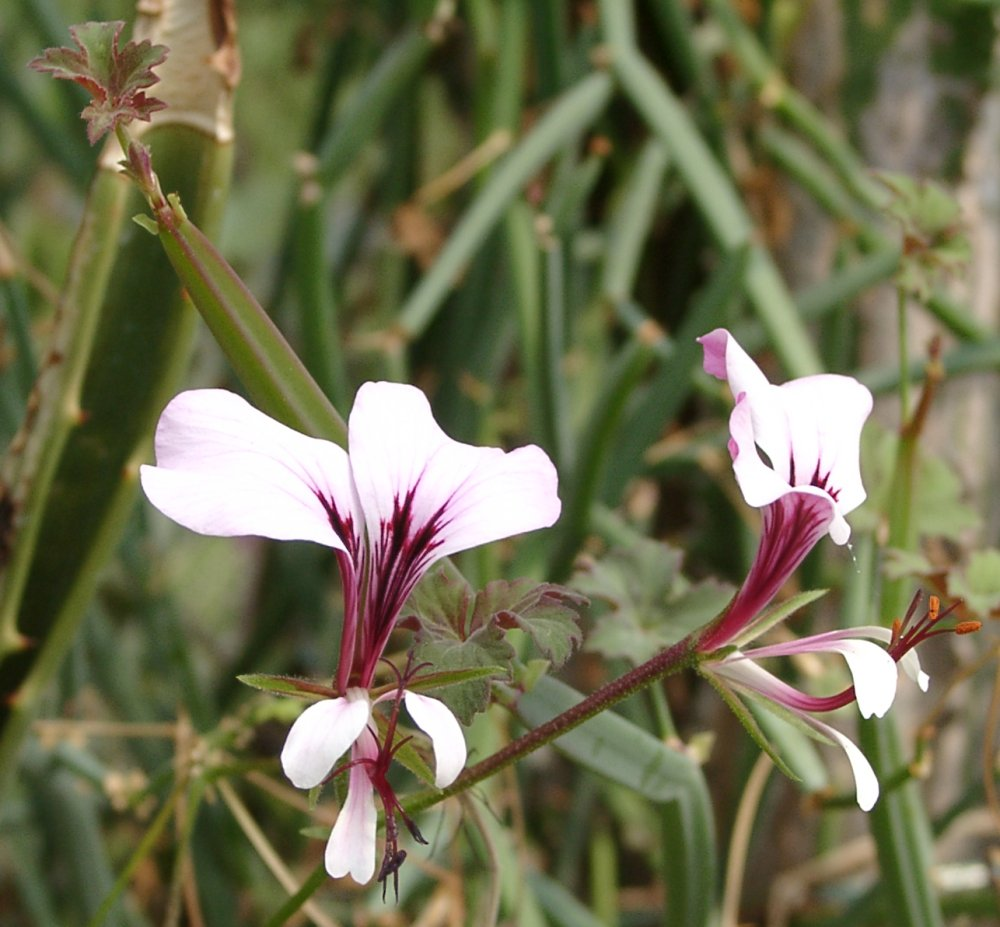
Subgenus Magnipetala section Chorisma: P. tetragonum

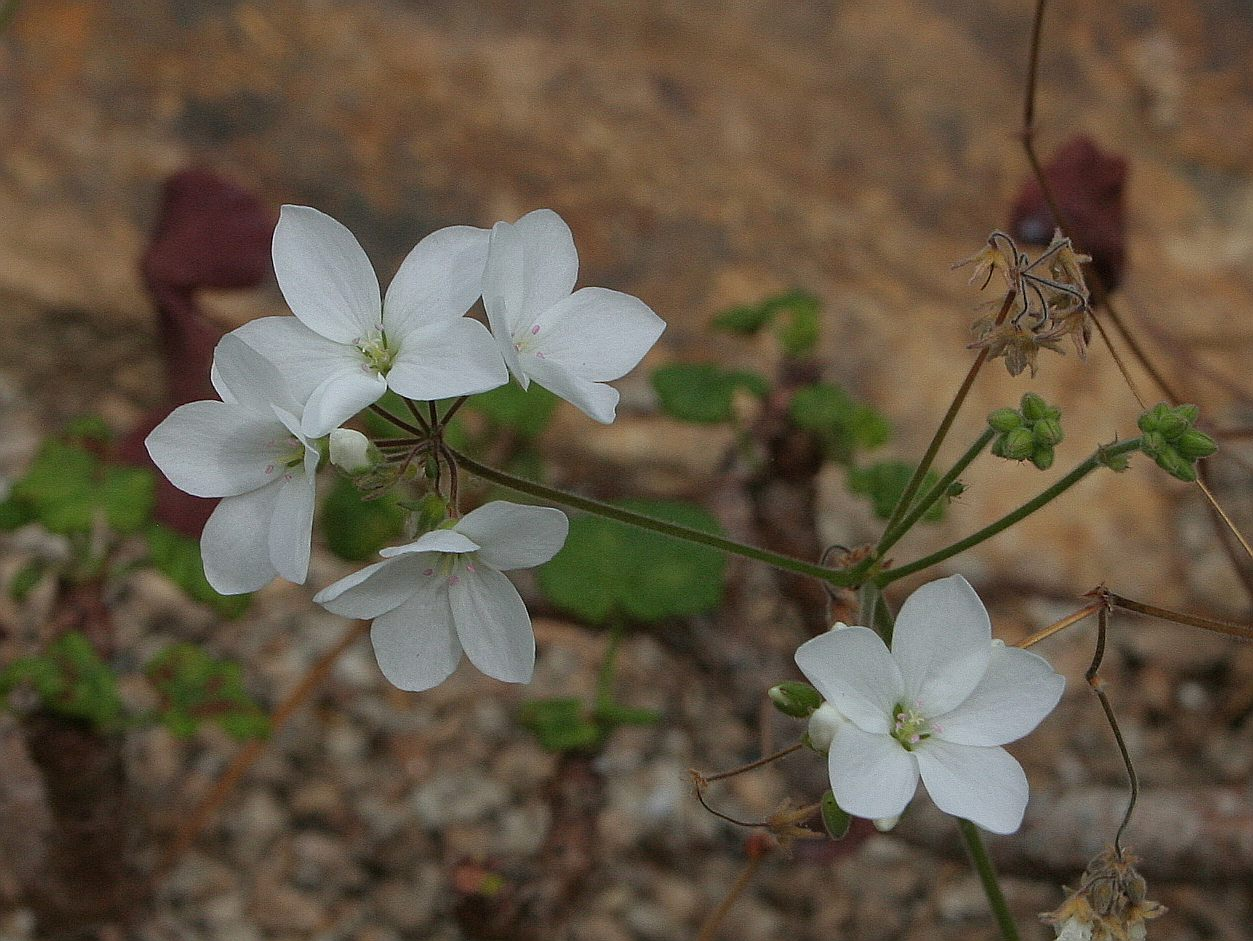
Subgenus Parvulipetala section Isopetalum: P. cotyledonis

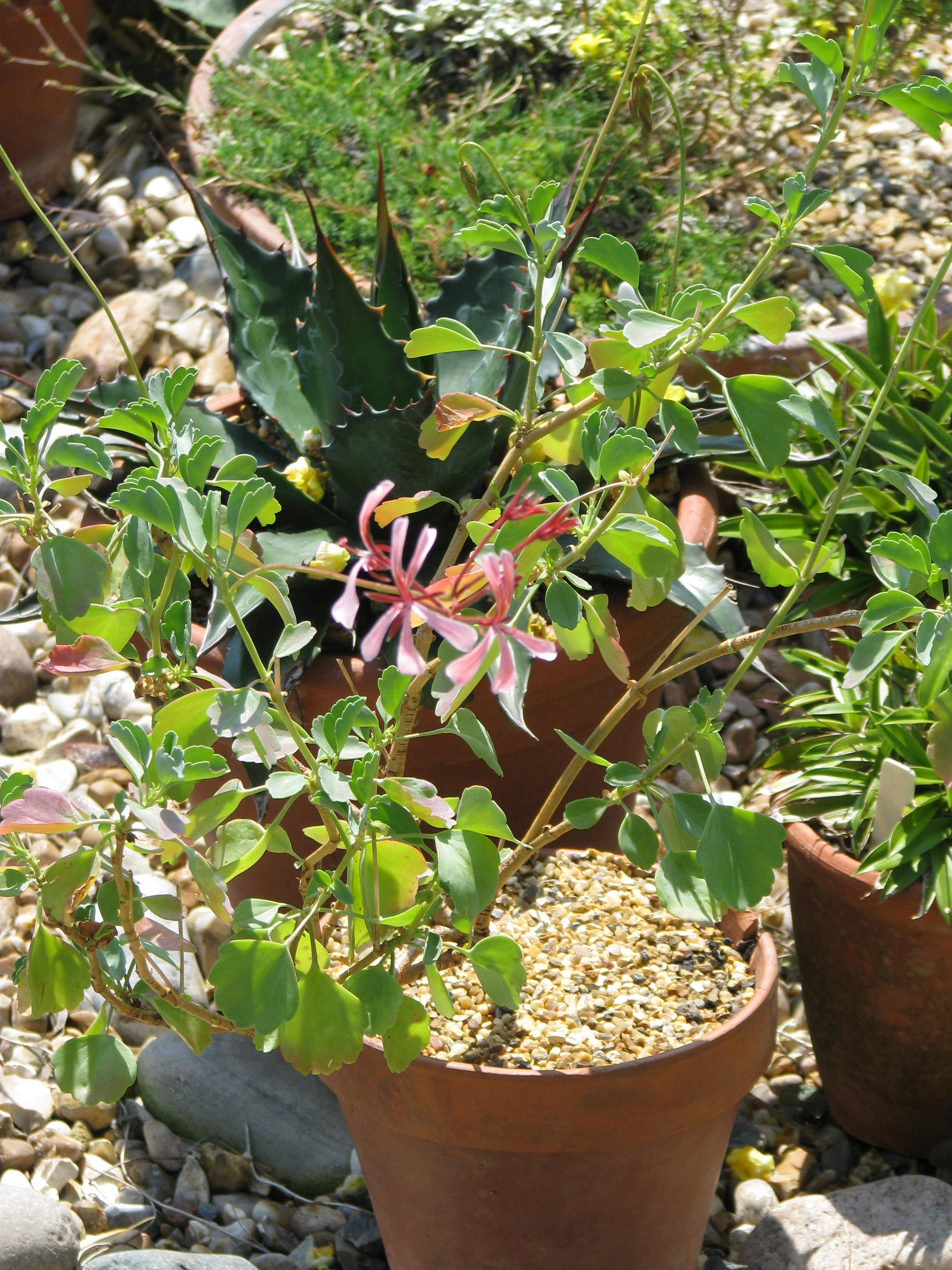
Subgenus Paucisignata section Ciconium: P. acetosum

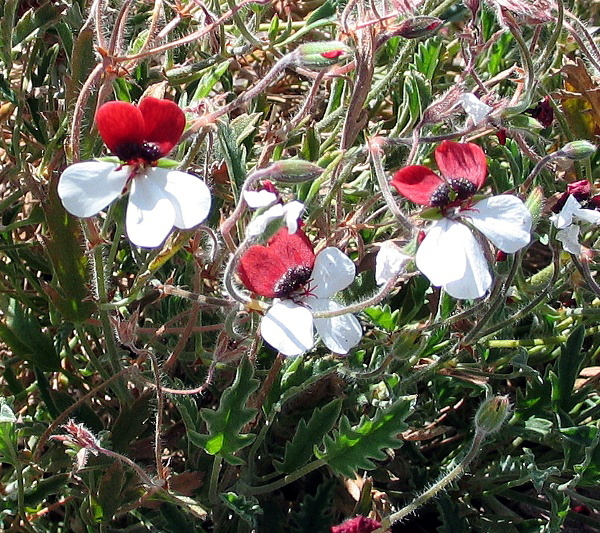
Subgenus Pelargonium section Campylia: P. tricolor

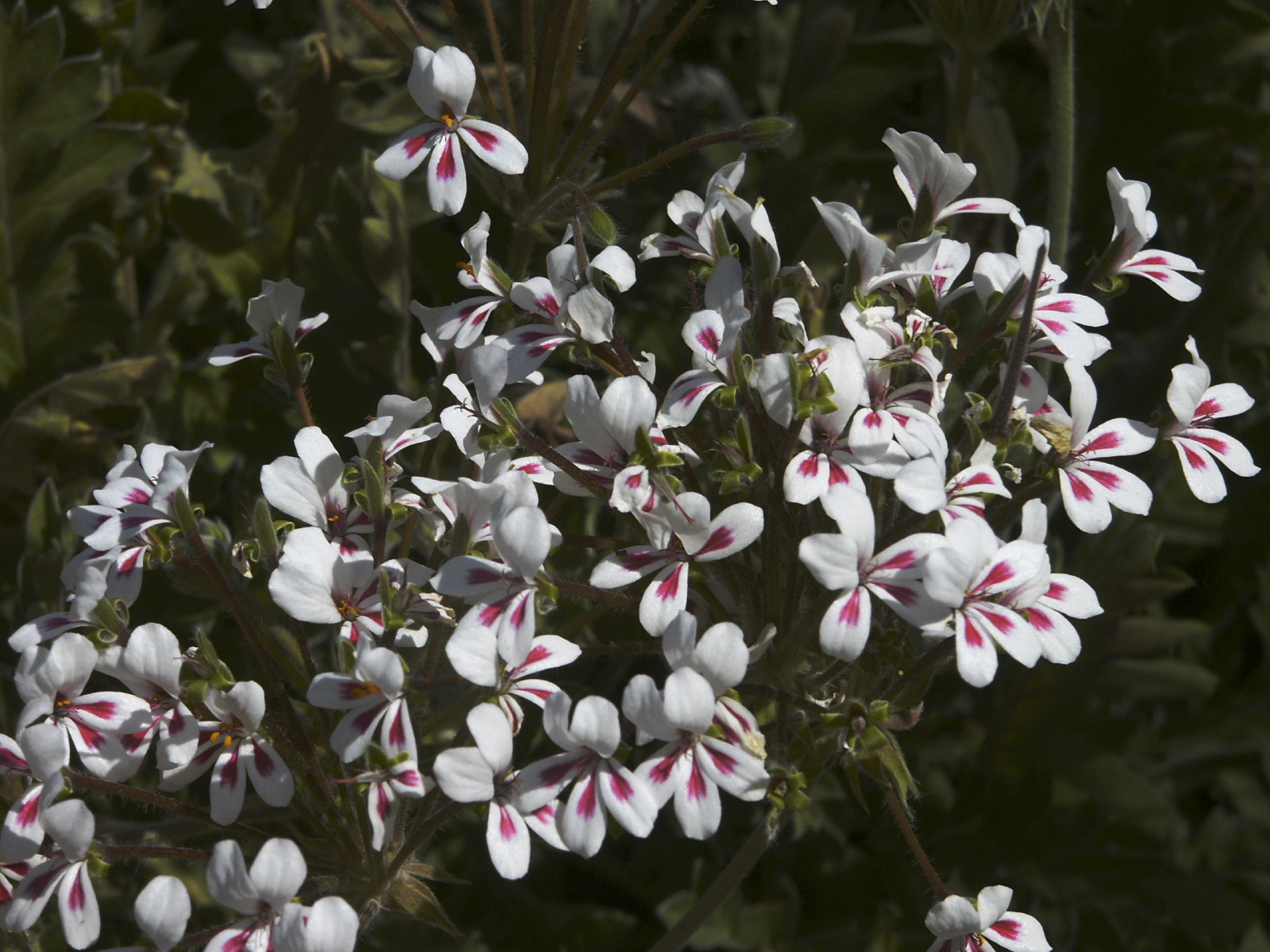
Subgenus Pelargonium section Otidia: P. crithmifolium

Thus Röschenbleck et al. (2014) provide a complete revision of the subgeneric classification of Pelargonium based on four subgenera corresponding to their major clades (A, B, C1, C2);

- subgenus Magnipetala Roeschenbl. & F. Albers Type: Pelargonium praemorsum (Andrews) F Dietrich
- subgenus Parvulipetala Roeschenbl. & F. Albers Type: Pelargonium hypoleucum Turczaninow
- subgenus Paucisignata Roeschenbl. & F. Albers Type: Pelargonium zonale (L.) L'Hér. in Aiton
- subgenus Pelargonium L'Hér. Type: Pelargonium cucullatum (L.) Aiton

Sixteen sections were then assigned to the new subgenera as follows, although many species remained only assigned to subgenera at this stage

- subgenus Magnipetala 3 sections
  - section Chorisma (Lindley ex Sweet) de Candolle – 4 species
  - section Jenkinsonia (Sweet) de Candolle – 11 species
  - section Myrrhidium de Candolle – 8 species
- subgenus Parvulipetala 3 sections
  - section Isopetalum (Sweet) de Candolle – 1 species (Pelargonium cotyledonis (L.) L'Hér.)
  - section Peristera de Candolle – 30 species
  - section Reniformia (Knuth) Dreyer – 8 species
- subgenus Paucisignata 2 sections
  - section Ciconium (Sweet) Harvey – 16 species
  - section Subsucculentia J.J.A. van der Walt – 3 species
- subgenus Pelargonium 8 sections
  - section Campylia (Lindley ex Sweet) de Candolle – 9 species
  - section Cortusina (DC.) Harvey – 7 species
  - section Hoarea (Sweet) de Candolle – 72 species
  - section Ligularia (Sweet) Harvey – 10 species
  - section Magnistipulacea Roeschenbl. & F. Albers Type: Pelargonium schlecteri Knuth – 2 subsections
    - subsection Magnistipulacea Roeschenbl. & F. Albers Type: Pelargonium schlecteri Knuth – 2 species (P. schlecteri & P. luridum)
    - subsection Schizopetala (Knuth) Roeschenbl. & F. Albers Type: Pelargonium afrum (Eckl. & Zeyh.) Steudel – 3 species (P. afrum, P. bowkeri, P. schizopetalum)
  - section Otidia (Lindley ex Sweet) de Candolle – 14 species
  - section Pelargonium L'Hér. – 34 species
  - section Polyactium de Candolle – 2 subsections
    - subsection Caulescentia Knuth – 1 species (Pelargonium gibbosum)
    - subsection Polyactium de Candolle – 7 species

=== Subgenera ===
Subgenus Magnipetala: Corresponds to clade C1, with 24 species. Perennial to short lived, spreading subshrubs, rarely herbaceous annuals. Petals five, but may be four, colour mainly white. Mainly winter rainfall region of South Africa, spreading into summer rainfall region. One species in northern Namibia and Botswana. Two species in East Africa and Ethiopia. Chromosomes x=11 and 9.

Subgenus Parvulipetala: Corresponds to clade B, with 39-42 species. Perennials, partly annuals. Petals five and equal, colour white or pink to deep purplish red. Mainly South Africa, but also other southern hemisphere except South America. a few species in East Africa and Ethiopia. Chromosomes x=7-19.

Subgenus Paucisignata: Corresponds to clade C2, with 25-27 species. Erect sometimes trailing shrubs or subshrubs, rarely geophytes or semi-geophytes. Petals five and equal, colour pink to red sometimes white. Summer rainfall region of South Africa, spreading into winter rainfall region and northern Namibia, with a few species in tropical Africa, Ethiopia, Somalia, Madagascar, the Arabian Peninsula and Asia Minor. Chromosomes x=mainly 9 or 10, but from 4–18.

Subgenus Pelargonium: Corresponds to clade A, with 167 species. Frequently xerophytic deciduous perennials with many geophytes and succulent subshrubs, less frequently woody evergreen shrubs or annual herbs. Petals five, colour shades of pink to purple or yellow. Winter rainfall region of South Africa and adjacent Namibia, spreading to summer rainfall area, and two species in tropical Africa. Chromosomes x=11, may be 8–10.

=== Species ===
Pelargonium has around 280 species. Röschenbleck et al lists 281 taxa. There is considerable confusion as to which Pelargonium are true species, and which are cultivars or hybrids. The nomenclature has changed considerably since the first plants were introduced to Europe in the 17th century.

=== Etymology ===
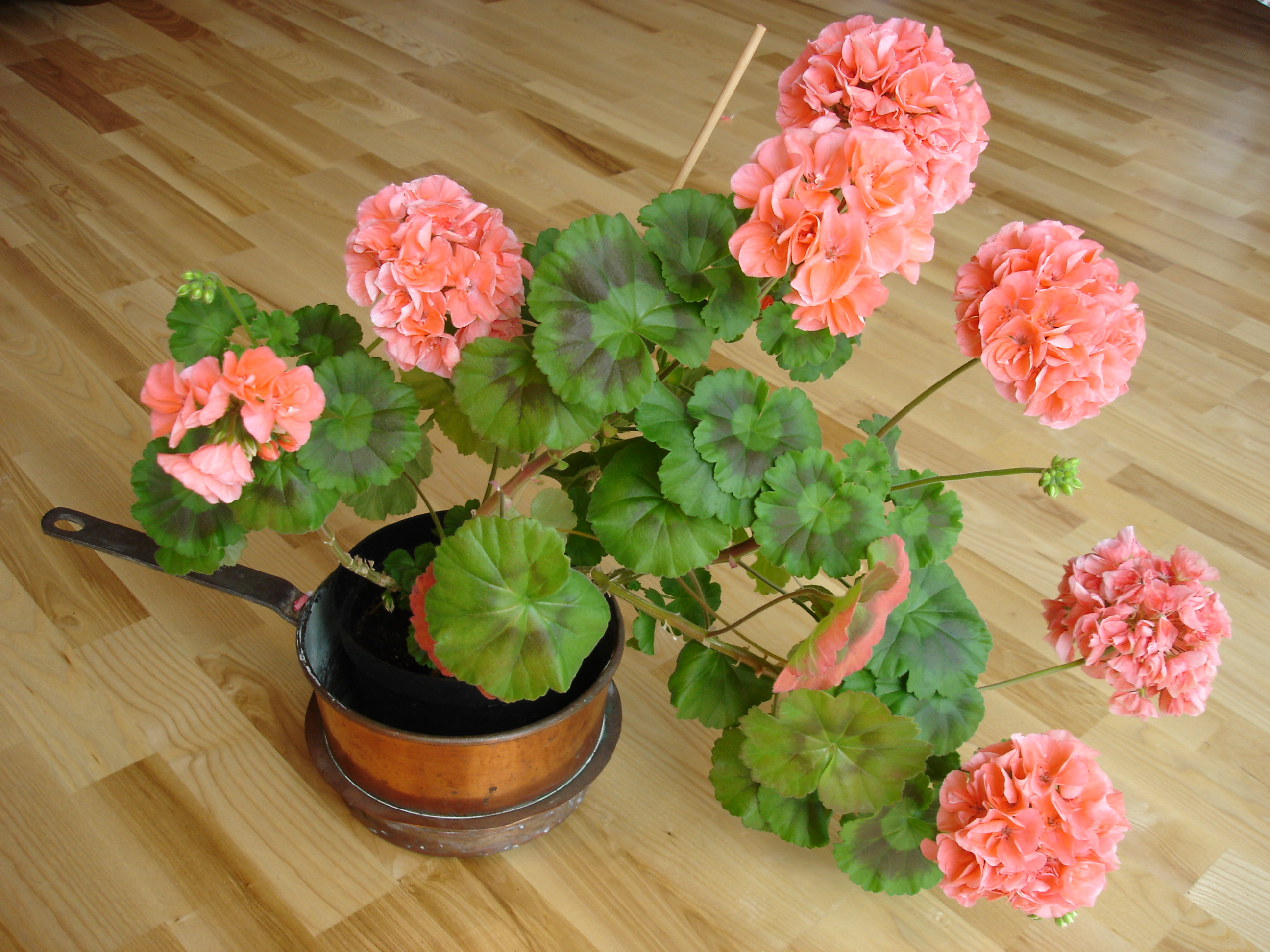
One of hundreds of garden and houseplant cultivars

The name Pelargonium is derived from the Greek πελαργός, pelargós (stork), because the seed head looks like a stork's beak. Dillenius originally suggested the name 'stork', because Geranium was named after a crane — "a πελαργός, ciconia, sicuti vocamus Gerania, γερανός, grus" (from pelargos, stork, as we call the Gerania, geranos, crane).

== Distribution and habitat ==
Pelargonium is a large genus within the family Geraniaceae, which has a worldwide distribution in temperate to subtropical zones with some 800 mostly herbaceous species. Pelargonium itself is native to southern Africa (including Namibia) and Australia. Southern Africa contains 90% of the genus, with only about 30 species found elsewhere, predominantly the East African rift valley (about 20 species) and southern Australia, including Tasmania. The remaining few species are found in southern Madagascar, Yemen, Iraq, Asia Minor, the north of New Zealand and isolated islands in the south Atlantic Ocean (Saint Helena and Tristan da Cunha) and Socotra in the Indian Ocean. The centre of diversity is in southwestern South Africa where rainfall is confined to the winter, unlike the rest of the country where rainfall is predominantly in the summer months. Most of the Pelargonium plants cultivated in Europe and North America have their origins in South Africa.

== Ecology ==
Pelargonium species are eaten by the caterpillars of some Lepidoptera species, including the noctuid moth angle shades, Phlogophora meticulosa. The diurnal butterflies Cacyreus marshalli and C. tespis (Lycaenidae), native to southern Africa, also feed on Geranium and Pelargonium. C. marshallii has been introduced to Europe and can develop into a pest on cultivated Pelargoniums. It has naturalised along the Mediterranean, but does not survive the winter in Western Europe.

The Japanese beetle, an important agricultural insect pest, becomes rapidly paralyzed after consuming flower petals of the garden hybrids known as "zonal geraniums" (P. × hortorum). The phenomenon was first described in 1920, and subsequently confirmed. Research conducted by Dr. Christopher Ranger with the USDA Agricultural Research Service and other collaborating scientists have demonstrated the excitatory amino acid called quisqualic acid present within the flower petals is responsible for causing paralysis of the Japanese beetle. Quisqualic acid is thought to mimic L-glutamic acid, which is a neurotransmitter in the insect neuromuscular junction and mammalian central nervous system.

A study by the Laboratory of Apiculture & Social Insects group at the University of Sussex on the attractiveness of common garden plants to pollinators found that a cultivar of Pelargonium × hortorum was unattractive to pollinators in comparison to other selected garden plants such as Lavandula (lavender) and Origanum.

=== Pests and diseases ===
The geranium bronze butterfly is a pest of Pelargonium species. The larvae of the geranium bronze bore into the stem of the host plant, causing the stem to typically turn black and die soon after. Geranium bronze are currently listed as an A2 quarantine pest by the European and Mediterranean Plant Protection Organization and can cause significant damage to Pelargonium species.

== Cultivation ==
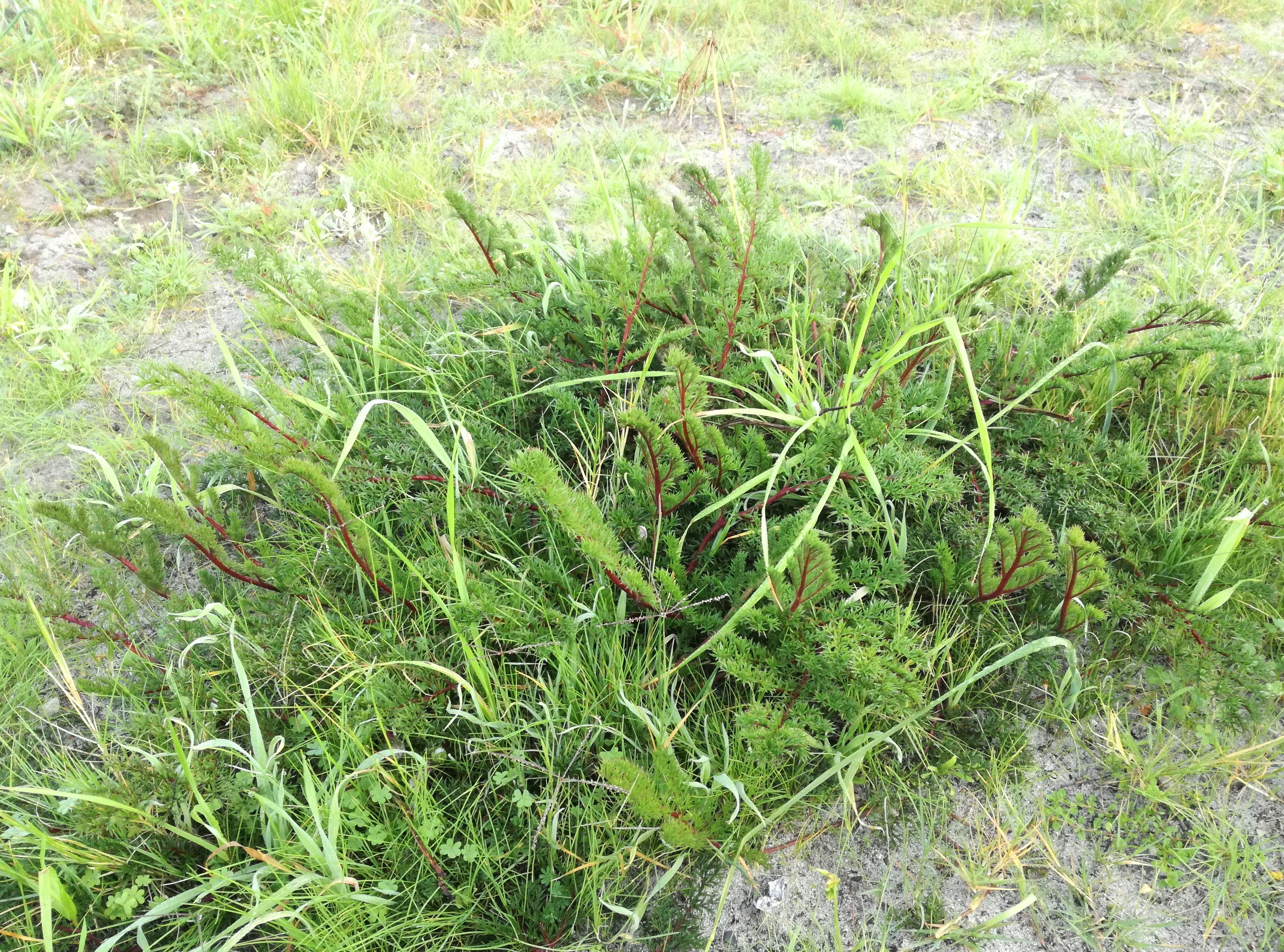
Pelargonium triste, the first species of its genus to be cultivated, here shown in its native habitat in Cape Town

Various types of Pelargonium are regular participants in flower shows and competitive events, with numerous societies devoted exclusively to their cultivation. They are easy to propagate vegetatively from cuttings. It is recommended that cuttings should have at least two nodes. Zonal geraniums grow in U.S. Department of Agriculture hardiness zones 9 through 12. Zonal geraniums are basically tropical perennials. Although they are often grown as annuals, they may overwinter in zones as cool as zone 7.

=== Cultivation history ===
The first species of Pelargonium known to be cultivated was P. triste, a native of South Africa. It was probably brought to the Botanical Garden in Leiden before 1600 on ships which had stopped at the Cape of Good Hope. In 1631, the English gardener John Tradescant the elder bought seeds from Rene Morin in Paris and introduced the plant to England. By 1724, P. inquinans, P. odoratissimum, P. peltatum, P. vitifolium, and P. zonale had been introduced to Europe.

=== Cultivars ===
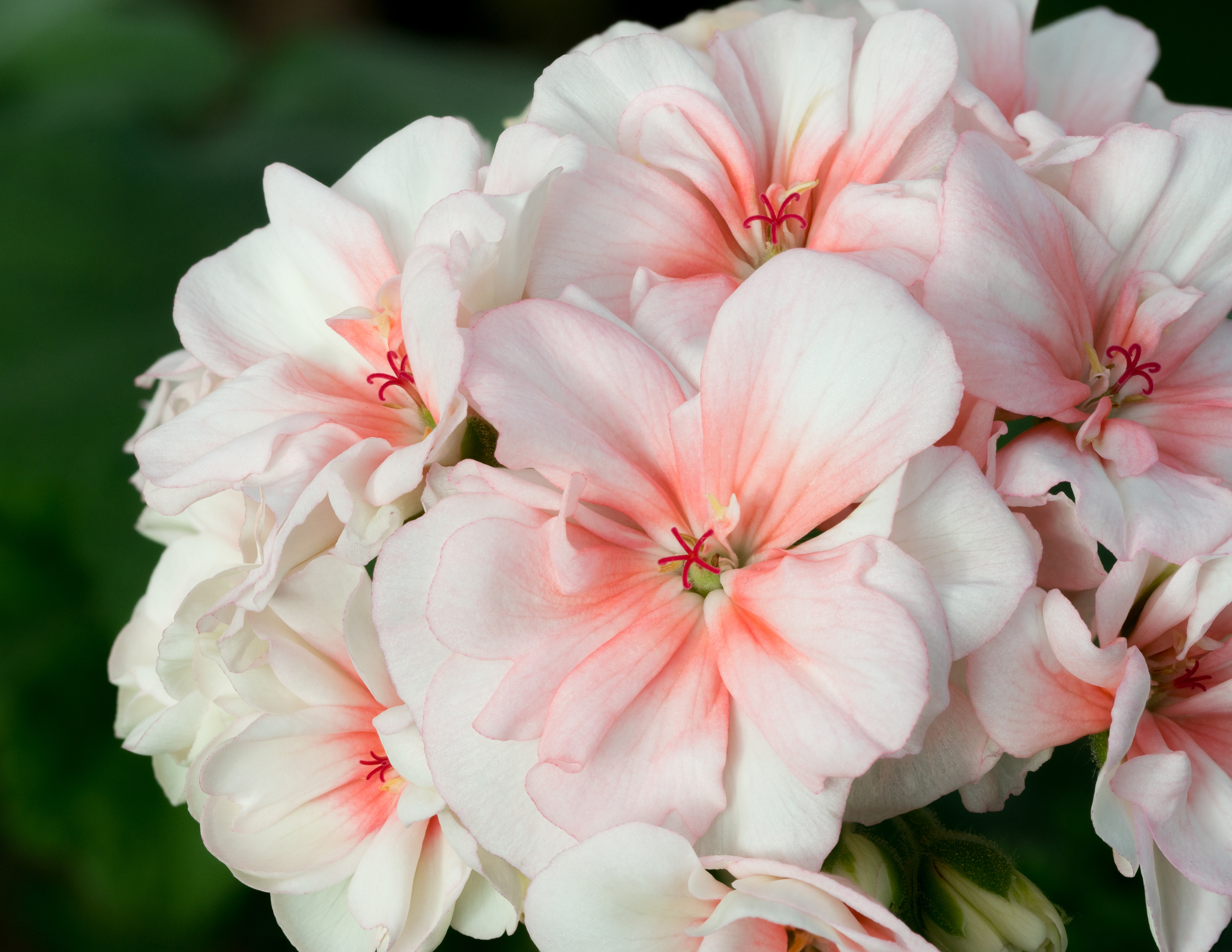
Zonal pelargonium

There was little attempt at any rational grouping of Pelargonium cultivars, the growing of which was revived in the mid-twentieth century, and the origins of many if not most were lost in obscurity. In 1916 the American botanist Liberty Hyde Bailey (1858–1954) introduced two new terms for zonal and regal pelargoniums. Those pelargoniums which were largely derived from P. zonale he referred to as P. × hortorum (i.e. from the garden), while those from P. cucullatum he named P. × domesticum (i.e. from the home). In the late 1950s a list (the Spalding List) was produced in the United States, based on nursery listings and the 1897 list of Henri Dauthenay. It described seven groups, listing each cultivar with the list of its originator, and in most cases a date. These were Species, Zonals, Variegated-Leaved, Domesticum (Regals), Ivy-Leaved, Scented-Leaved and Old. In the 1970s the British Pelargonium and Geranium Society produced a checklist and the Australian Geranium Society started to produce a register but it was not completed till its author, Jean Llewellyn's death in 1999. None of these were published. The most complete list in its time was the 2001 compilation by The Geraniaceae Group, which included all cultivars up to 1959.

Registration of cultivars is the responsibility of the Pelargonium & Geranium Society (PAGS: formed in 2009 from the British Pelargonium and Geranium Society and the British and European Geranium Society) which administers the International Register of Pelargonium Cultivars. PAGS is the International Cultivar Registration Authority (ICRA) of the International Society for Horticultural Science for pelargoniums.

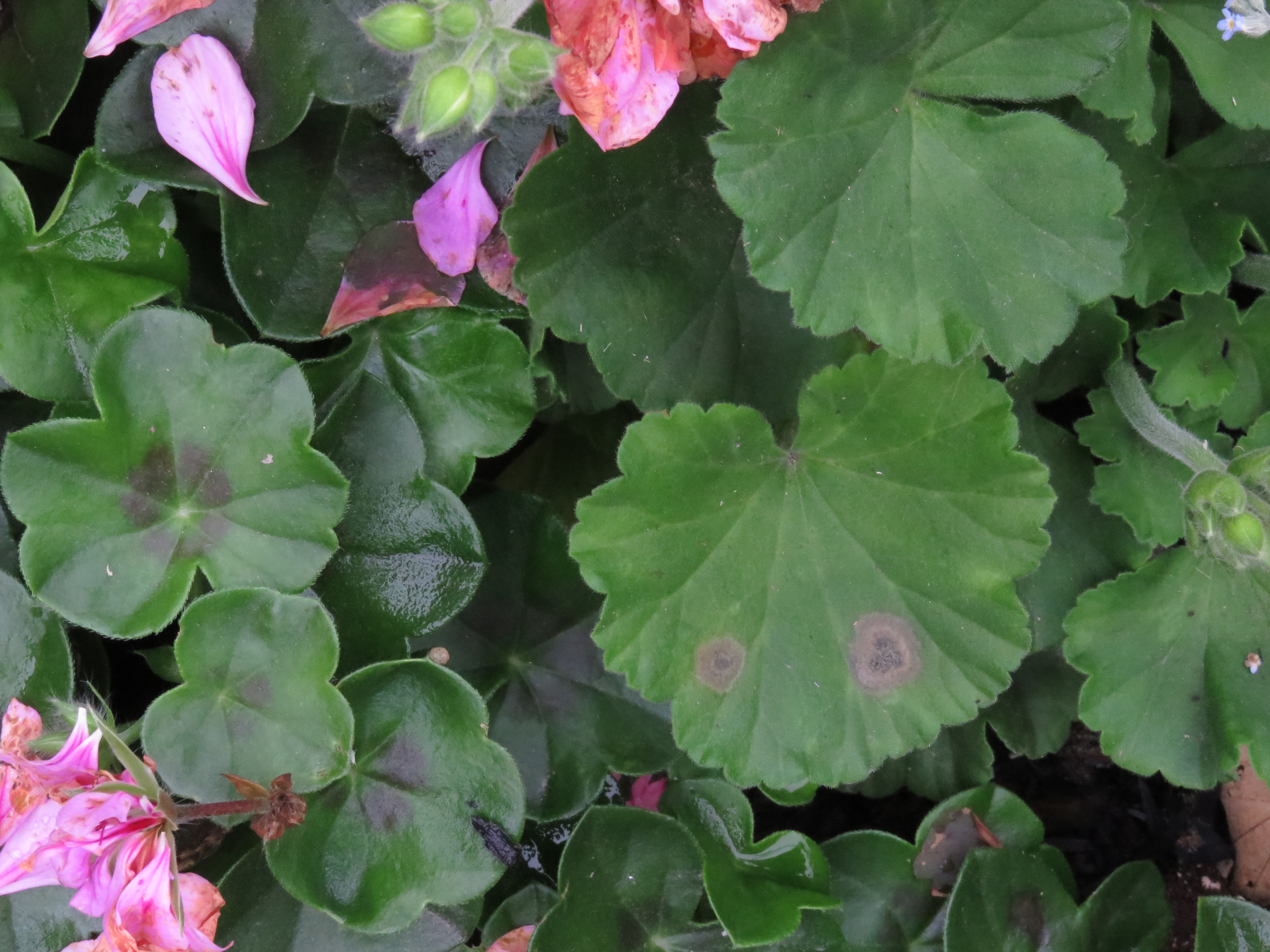
Contrasting leaves: Ivy-leaved Group (left) and Zonal Group (right)

Cultivated pelargoniums are commonly divided into six groups in addition to species pelargoniums and primary hybrids. The following list is ordered by position in the PAGS classification. Abbreviations indicate Royal Horticultural Society usage.

- A. Zonal (Z)
- B. Ivy-leaved (I)
- C. Regal (R)
- D. Angel (A)
- E. Unique (U)
- F. Scented-leaved (Sc)
- G. Species
- H. Primary hybrids

Of these, A, U and Sc groups are sometimes lumped together as Species Derived (Sppd). This term implies that they are closely related to a species from which they were derived, and do not fit into the R, I or Z groups.

In addition to the primary groups, additional descriptors are used. The Royal Horticultural Society has created description codes. These include;

- Cactus (Ca)
- Coloured foliage (C)
- Decorative (Dec)
- Double (d)
- Dwarf (Dw)
- Dwarf Ivy-leaved (Dwl)
- Frutetorum (Fr)
- Miniature (Min)
- Miniature Ivy-leaved (MinI)
- Stellar (St)
- Tulip (T)
- Variegated (v)

These may then be combined to form the code, e.g. Pelargonium 'Chelsea Gem' (Z/d/v), indicating Zonal Double with variegated foliage. Crosses between groups are indicated with an ×, e.g. Pelargonium 'Hindoo' (R × U), indicating a Regal × Unique cross.

==== A. Zonal pelargoniums (Pelargonium × hortorum Bailey) ====
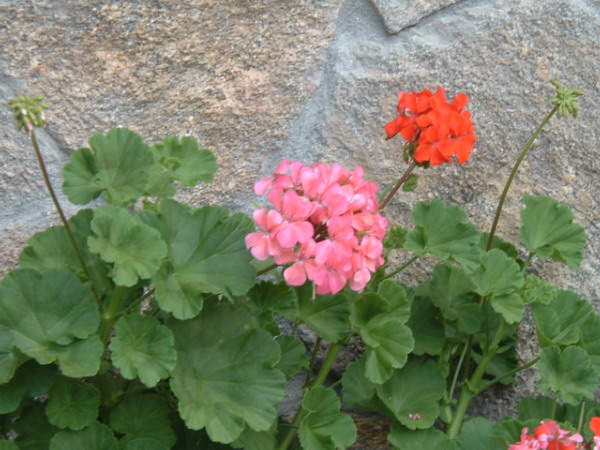
Pelargonium × hortorum (Zonal)

These are known as zonal geraniums because many have zones or patterns in the center of the leaves, this is the contribution of the Pelargonium zonale parent. Common names include storksbill, fish or horseshoe geraniums. They are also referred to as Pelargonium × hortorum Bailey. Zonal pelargoniums are tetraploid, mostly derived from P. inquinans and P. zonale, together with P. scandens and P. frutetorum.

Zonal pelargoniums are mostly bush-type plants with succulent stems grown for the beauty of their flowers, traditionally red, salmon, violet, white or pink. The scarlet colouring is attributed to the contribution of P. inquinans. Flowers may be double or single. They are the pelargoniums most often confused with the genus Geranium, particularly in summer bedding arrangements. This incorrect nomenclature is widely used in horticulture, particularly in North America.

Zonals include a variety of plant types along with genetic hybrids such as hybrid ivy-leaved varieties that display little or no ivy leaf characteristics (the Deacons varieties), or the Stellar varieties. Hybrid zonals are crosses between zonals and either a species or species-derived pelargonium. There are hundreds of zonal cultivars available for sale, and like other cultivars are sold in series such as 'Rocky Mountain', each of which is named after its predominant colour, e.g. 'Rocky Mountain Orange', 'White', 'Dark Red', etc.

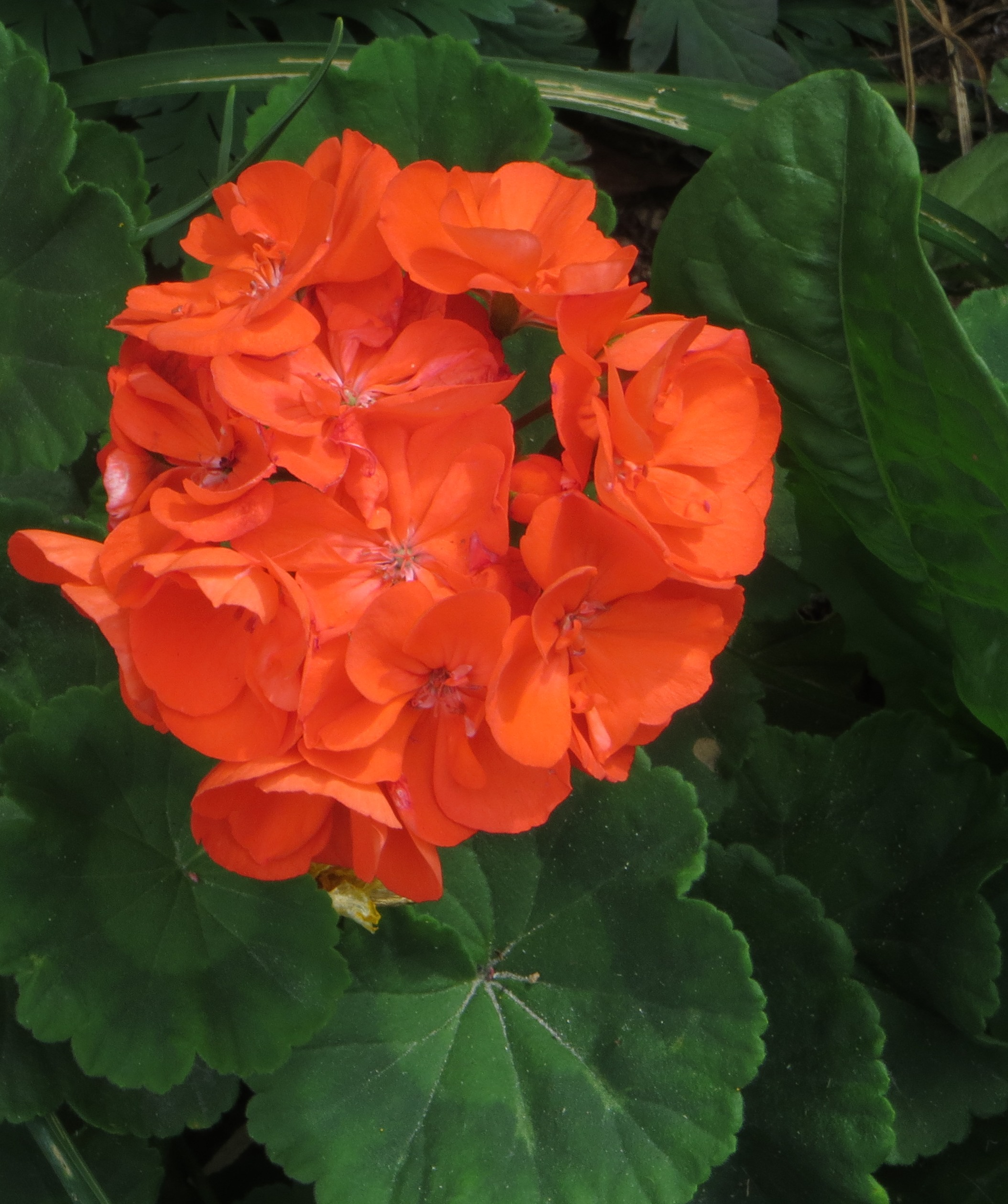
'Rocky Mountain Orange' (Zonal)

- (i) Basic plants – Mature plants with foliage normally exceeding 18 cm (7 in) in height above the rim of the pot. For exhibition these should be grown in a pot exceeding 12 cm (4 3/4 in) in diameter but not normally exceeding 165 mm (6 1/2 in).
- (ii) Dwarf plants – Smaller than basic. Mature plants with foliage more than 12.5 cm (5 in) above the rim of the pot, but not normally more than 18 cm (7 in). For exhibition should be grown in a pot exceeding 9 cm (3 1/2 in) but not exceeding 12 cm (4 3/4 in). They should not exceed 20 cm in height, grown in an 11-cm pot.
- (iii) Miniature plants – Slowly growing pelargoniums. Mature plants with foliage normally less than 12.5 cm (5 in) above the rim of the pot. For exhibition should be grown in a pot not exceeding 9 cm (3 1/2 in). They should not exceed 12.5 cm in height, grown in a 9-cm pot.
- (iv) Micro-miniature plants – Smaller and more slowly growing than miniature pelargoniums. Mature plants with foliage normally less than 10 cm (4 in) above the rim of the pot. They should not exceed 7.5 cm in height, grown in a 6-cm pot. Usually no separate classes for these in exhibition and will therefore normally be shown as Miniature Zonals.
- (v) Deacon varieties –Genetic hybrid similar to a large Dwarf. For exhibition (when shown in a separate class), usually grown in a pot not exceeding 12.5 cm (5 in), otherwise as for Dwarf Zonals.
- (vi) Stellar varieties – A relatively modern genetic hybrid originating from the work done by the Australian hybridiser Ted Both in the late 1950s and 1960s from crosses between Australian species and Zonal types. Easily identifiable by their distinctive half-star-shaped leaves and slim-petalled blooms which create an impression of being star shaped (or five fingered). Single varieties tend to have larger elongated triangular petals whereas doubles tend to have thin feathered petals that are tightly packed together. For exhibition purposes there is a separate class for 'Stellar' varieties, but being Zonals could be shown in an open class for Basic, Dwarf or Miniature Zonals (unless otherwise stated). Also known as "The Five-fingered Geraniums", "Staphysagroides", "Both’s Staphs", "Both’s Hybrid Staphs", "Fingered Flowers" and "Bodey’s Formosum Hybrids".
- (vii) Zonartic hybrids – Zonartic pelargoniums are a group of hybrids bred by Australian horticulturist Cliff Blackman. Hybridisation to establish this group began in 1985 through crosses between zonal pelargoniums (Pelargonium × hortorum) and the wild species Pelargonium articulatum. The name “Zonartic” derives from zonal and articulatum, reflecting this genetic combination. Blackman’s breeding programme produced a distinctive line of pelargoniums noted for their large, luminous flowers and for his effort to develop a true yellow pelargonium. Since then, Zonartic breeding has spread internationally, with active hybridisers in the United Kingdom, Sweden, Russia, and other countries. Breeders often identify their hybrids through a prefix; for example, Blackman used the prefix ‘Lara’ for his cultivars.

Fancy-leaf zonal pelargoniums – besides having green leaves with or without zoning, this group also have variable coloured foliage that is sometimes used in classifying for exhibition purposes, e.g. 'Bicolour', 'Tricolour', 'Bronze' or 'Gold'. Other foliage types are: 'Black' or 'Butterfly'. There are an increasing number of these plants with showy blooms;

- (a) Bicolour – includes those with white or cream veined leaves or those with two distinct colours with clearly defined edges, other than the basic zone.
- (b) Tricolour – (May be Silver Tricolour (usually called a Silver Leaf) or a Gold Tricolour).
  - (i) Gold Tricolour – Leaves of many colours including red and gold, but usually with clearly defined edges of golden yellow and having a leaf zone, usually red or bronze, that overlays two or more of the other distinct leaf colours, so that the zone itself appears as two or more distinct colours.
  - (ii) Silver Tricolour or Silver Leaf – These tend to resemble a normal bi-colour leaf plant with two distinct colours usually of green and pale cream or white; the third colour is usually made up of bronze zoning. When this zoning overlays the green part of the leaf it is deemed to represent a silver colour.
- (c) Bronze Leaved – Leaves of Green or Golden/Green with a heavy bronze or chestnut coloured centre zone which is known as a medallion. For exhibition purposes, when exhibited in specific ‘Bronze’ Leaf class – Must have over 50% of leaf surface bronze coloured. The dwarf plant ‘Overchurch’ which has a heavy bronze medallion.
- (d) Gold Leaved – Leaves coloured golden/yellow or green/yellow but not showing a tendency to green. For exhibition purposes, when exhibited in specific ‘Gold’ Leaf class – Must have over 50% of leaf surface gold coloured.
- (e) Black Leaved – Leaves coloured black, purple-black or with distinct large dark zones or centre markings on green.
- (f) Butterfly Leaved – Leaves with a butterfly marking of distinct tone or hue in centre of leaf. This can be encompassed in many of the coloured leaf varieties.

Zonal pelargoniums have many flower types, as follows:

- (a) Single flowered (S) – each flower pip normally having no more than five petals. This is the standard flower set for all Pelargoniums.
- (b) Semi-double flowered (SD) – each flower pip normally having between six and nine petals.
- (c) Double flowered (D)– each flower pip composed of more than nine petals (i.e. double the standard flower set) but not ‘hearted’ like the bud of a rose, e.g. the dwarf ‘Dovepoint’ which has full double blooms.
- (d) Rosebud (or noisette) flowered – each bloom fully double and ‘hearted’. The middle petals are so numerous that they remain unopened like the bud of a rose.
- (e) Tulip flowered – having semi-double blooms that never fully open. The large cup shaped petals open just sufficiently to resemble a miniature tulip.
- (f) Bird's-egg group – having blooms with petals that have spots in a darker shade than the base colour, like many birds eggs.
- (g) Speckled flowered group – having petals that are marked with splashes and flecks of another colour, e.g. ‘Vectis Embers’.
- (h) Quilled (or cactus-flowered group, or poinsettia in US) – having petals twisted and furled like a quill.

“Zonquil” pelargoniums result from a cross between Zonal pelargonium cultivars and P. quinquelobatum.

==== B. Ivy-leaved pelargoniums (derived from Pelargonium peltatum) ====
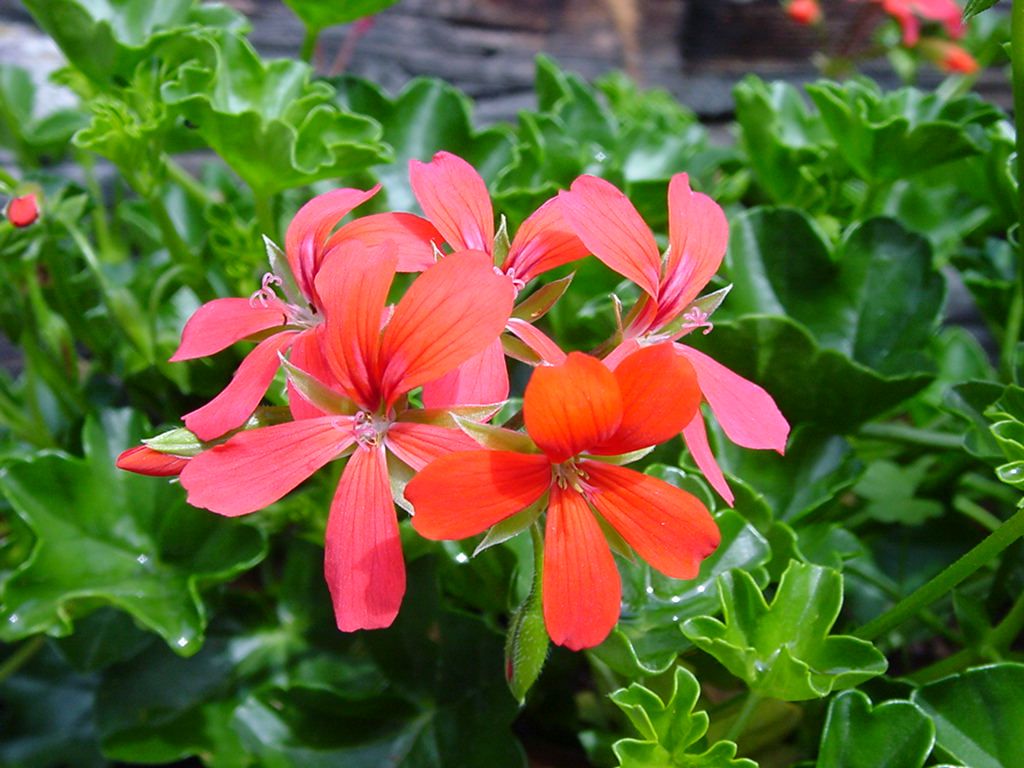
Pelargonium peltatum (Ivy-leaved)

Also known as "ivy geraniums". Usually of lax growth (trailing), mainly due to the long thin stems, with thick, waxy ivy-shaped stiff fleshy evergreen leaves developed by the species P. peltatum to retain moisture during periods of drought. Much used for hanging pots, tubs and basket cultivation. In the UK the bulbous double-headed types are preferred whilst on the European continent the balcon single types for large-scale hanging floral displays are favoured. Ivy-leaved pelargoniums embrace all such growth size types including small-leaved varieties and genetic hybrid crosses, which display little or no zonal characteristics. May have bicolour leaves and may have flowers that are single, double or rosette. Ivy pelargoniums are often sold as series such as 'Great Balls of Fire', in a variety of colours such as 'Great Balls of Fire Burgundy'.

Additional descriptive terms include;

- Hybrid Ivy — the result of ivy × zonal crosses, but still more closely resemble ivy-leaved pelargoniums.
- Fancy leaf — leaves with marked color variation, together with or other than green.
- Miniature — miniature leaves and flowers, stems with short nodes, and compact growth. e.g. 'Sugar Baby' listed as Dwarf Ivy (DwI) by RHS.

==== C. Regal pelargoniums (Pelargonium × domesticum Bailey) ====
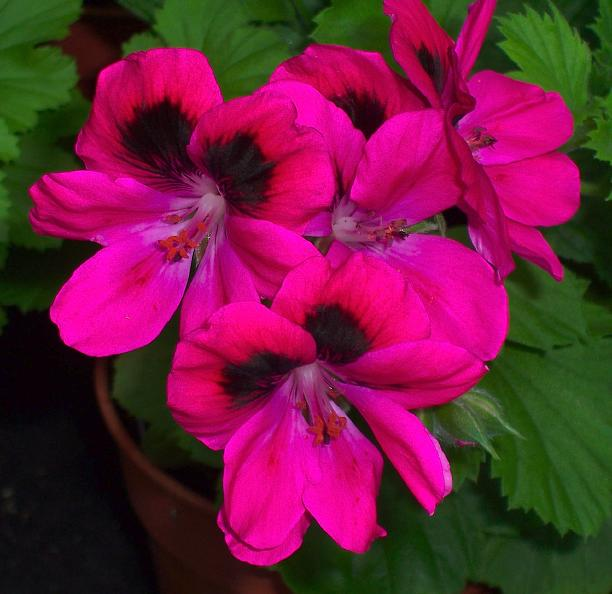
'Karl Offenstein' (Regal)

These are large bush-type floriferous evergreen pelargoniums. In addition to "Regals" they are also known as “Show Pelargoniums”. In the US they are often known as the "Martha Washington" or "Lady Washington" pelargoniums. They are grown primarily for the beauty and richness of their flower heads, which are large. Most of those cultivars grown currently are the result of hybridization over the last 50 years. They are very short-jointed and compact, which results in their requiring very little work in order to create a floriforous and well-rounded plant. Flowers are single, rarely double, in mauve, pink, purple or white. They have rounded, sometimes lobed or partially toothed (serrated) leaves, unlike the Zonal groups, without any type of zoning.

Additional descriptive terms include;

- Fancy leaf – Leaves with marked variations in colour
- Decorative pelargoniums (Decoratives) – Descendants of older, less compact, smaller-flowered varieties that are more suited to outdoor conditions. These have smaller flowers than Regal, but are otherwise similar. e.g. 'Royal Ascot'
- Miniature – Flowers and leaves similar to Regal, but miniature in form, with compact growth. Other terms include "Pansy Geraniums" or "Pansy Pelargoniums". e.g. 'Lara Susan'
- Oriental pelargoniums – The result of crosses between Regals and members of the Angel group (see below). Some have bicolour foliage.

==== D. Angel pelargoniums (derived from Pelargonium crispum) ====
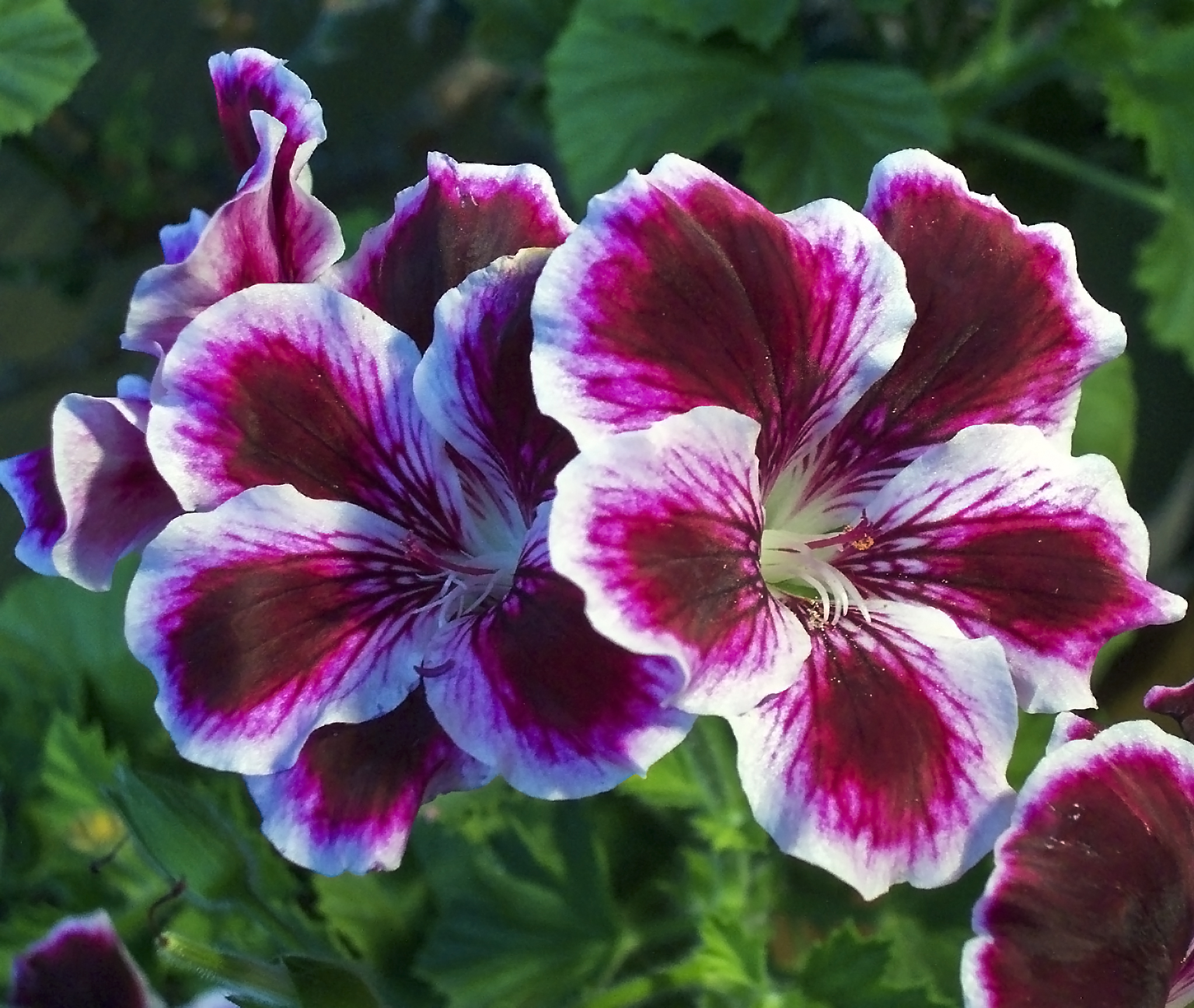
'Angeleyes Randy' (Angel)

Angel pelargoniums are similar to Regal pelargoniums but more closely resemble P. crispum in leaf shape and growth habit. The majority of Angel cultivars originate from a cross between P. crispum and a Regal variety in the early part of the 20th century. Angels have grown in popularity in the last 30 years or so due mainly to an explosion of new varieties being released by specialist nurseries resulting from the work done by dedicated amateur hybridisers. These hybrisers have managed to obtain many new flower colour breaks and tighter growth habits resulting in plants suitable for all sorts of situations. Angels basically have the appearance of a small Regal with small serrated leaves and much smaller flowers and are more compact and bushy. The group extends to include similar small-leaved and -flowered types but usually with P. crispum in their parentage. They are mostly upright bush-type plants but there are some lax varieties that can be used for basket or hanging pot cultivation. Often called "pansy-faced" in the US. Some varieties have bicolour foliage. Other terms include ‘Langley-Smith Hybrids’.

==== E. Unique pelargoniums (derived from Pelargonium fulgidum) ====
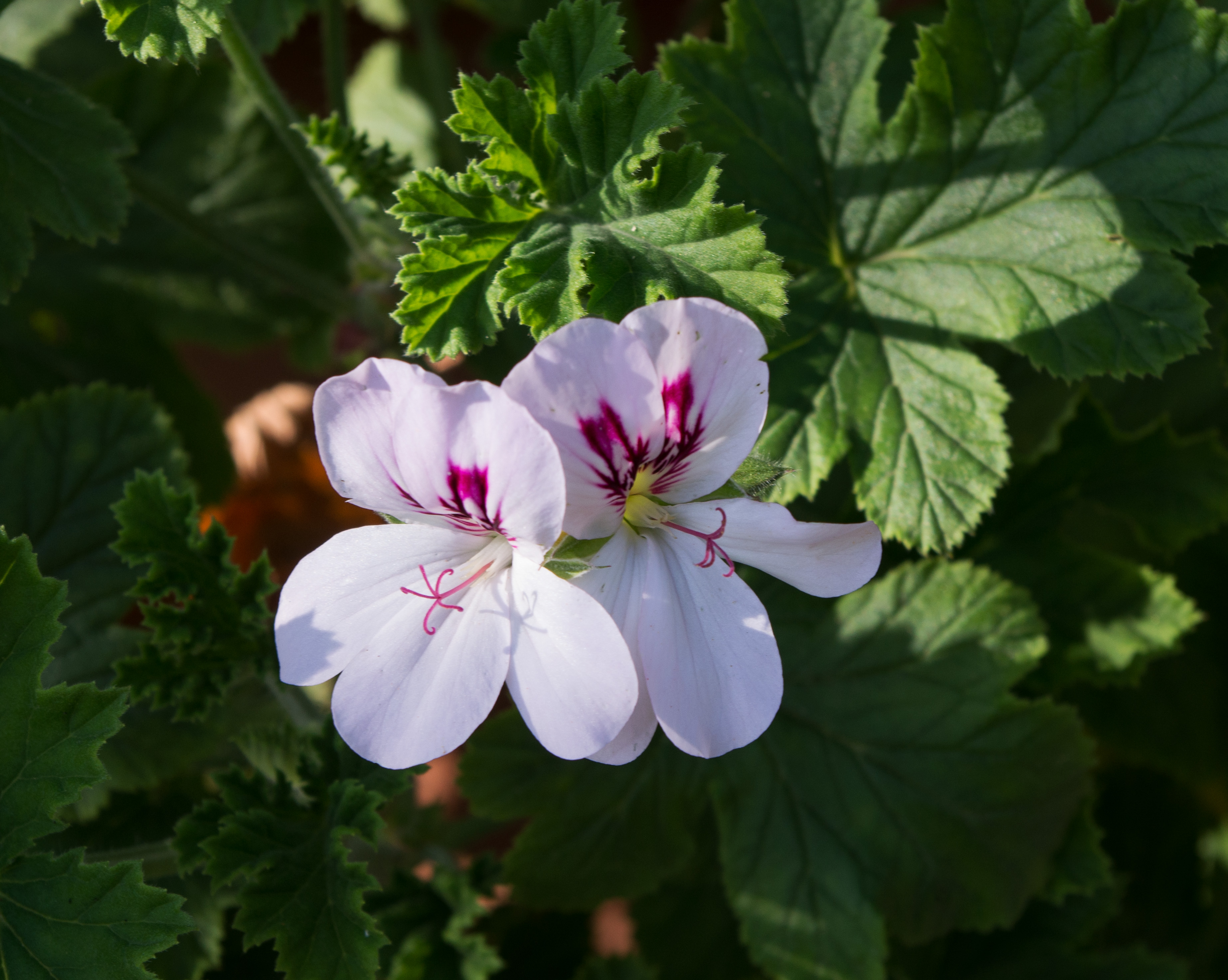
'White Unique' (Unique)

Unique in sense of not fitting into any of the above categories. The parentage of Unique pelargoniums is confused and obscure. One theory being a derivation from P. fulgidum, but a derivation from an older cultivar 'Old Unique', also known as or 'Rollinson’s Crimson', in the mid-19th century is also claimed. Unique pelargoniums resemble upright Scented Leaf pelargoniums in being shrubby and woody evergreens. They have distinctly scented leaves, and small flowers with blotched and feathered petals. They may have bicolour foliage. Some types, popularly known in the hobby as hybrid Uniques, have been crossed with Regal pelargoniums and, as a result of this cross, are much more floriferous.

Cultivar

- Fiery-flowered Stork's-bill, Scarlet Unique Scented Geranium (P. × ignescens) – a P. fulgidum hybrid

==== F. Scented-leaved pelargoniums ====
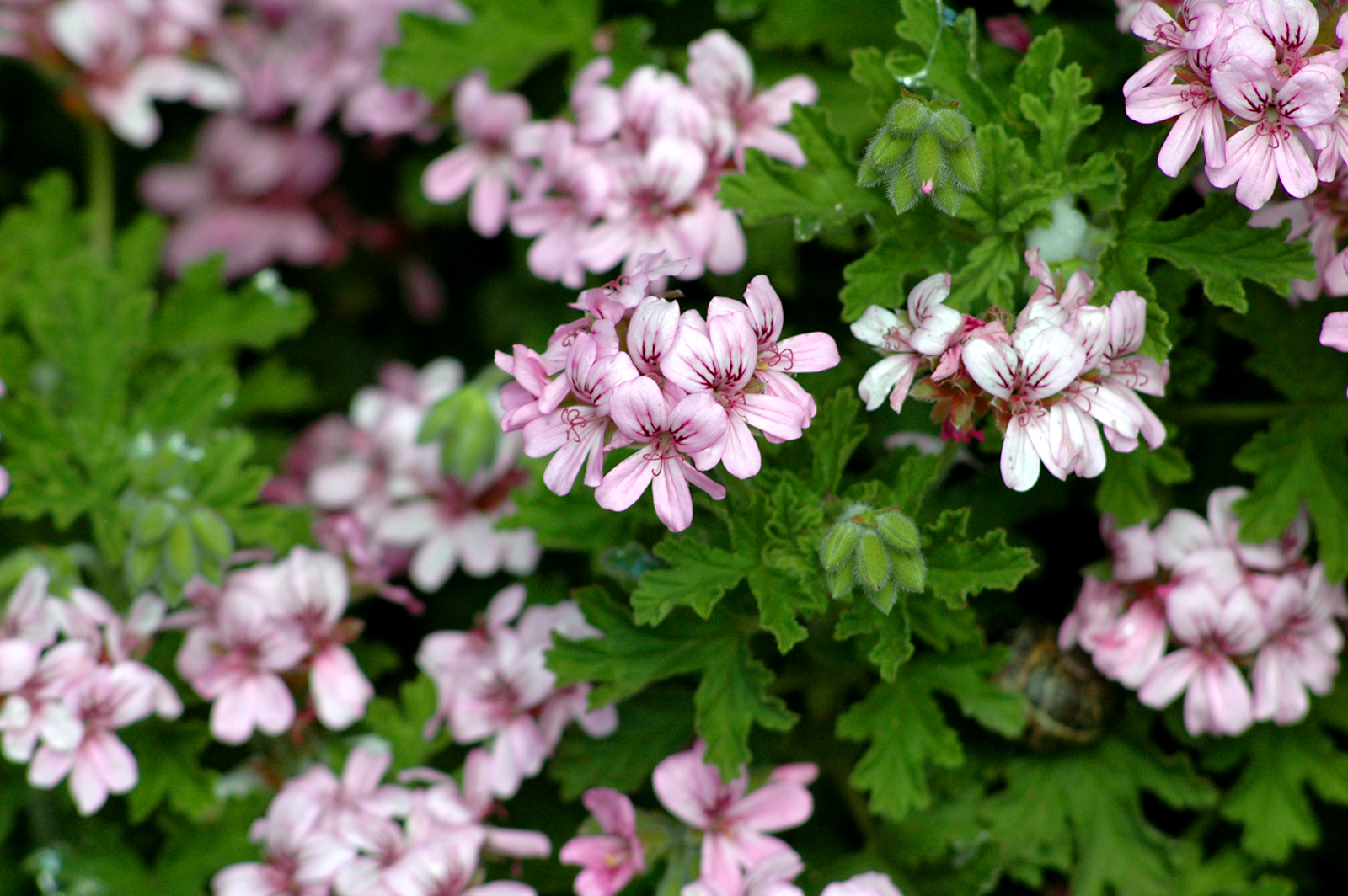
P. graveolens (scented leaf)

Shrubby evergreen perennials grown chiefly for their fragrance, may be species or cultivars but all must have a clear and distinct scented foliage. Scent is emitted when the leaves are touched or bruised with some scents aromatic, others pungent and in a few cases, quite unpleasant. Several of the scented leaved pelargoniums are grown for the oil geraniol, which is extracted from the leaves and is an essential oil much used commercially in perfumery. The scent of some species growing in their natural habitat, acts as a deterrent to grazing animals who appear to dislike the emitted scent. Conversely, it also attracts other insect life to visit the bloom and pollinate the plant. The scented leaves can be used for potpourri and they also have a use as flavourings in cooking. Occasionally scented types can be found in some of the other groups mentioned; for example, the Angels, having P. crispum in their genetic makeup, can often have a strong citrus scent. Leaves are lobed, toothed, incised or variegated. Growth habit is very variable, but the flowers are less prominent than other groups, and most closely resemble the species they originated from.

These include:

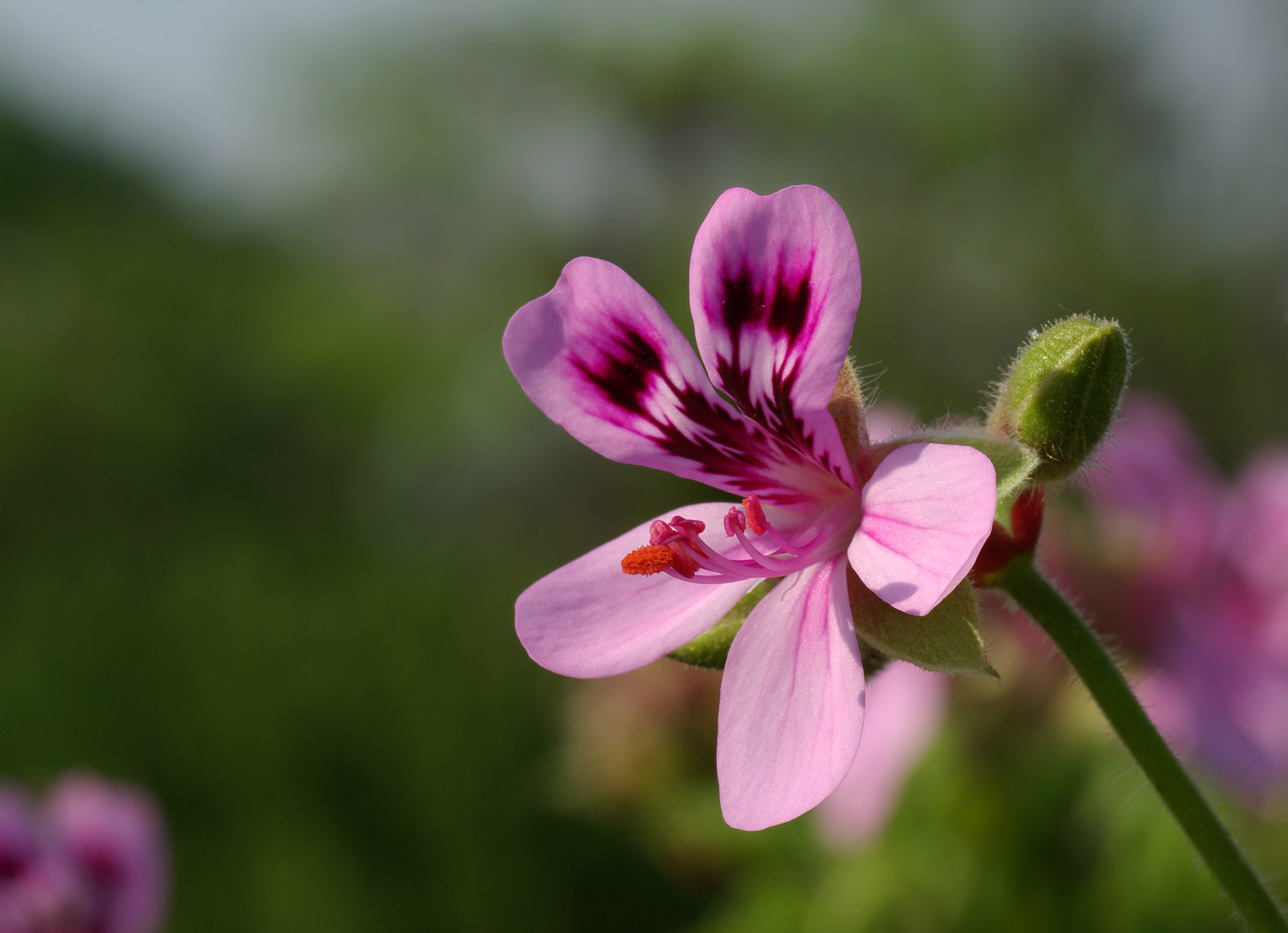
P. quercifolium 'Fair Ellen' (scented leaf)

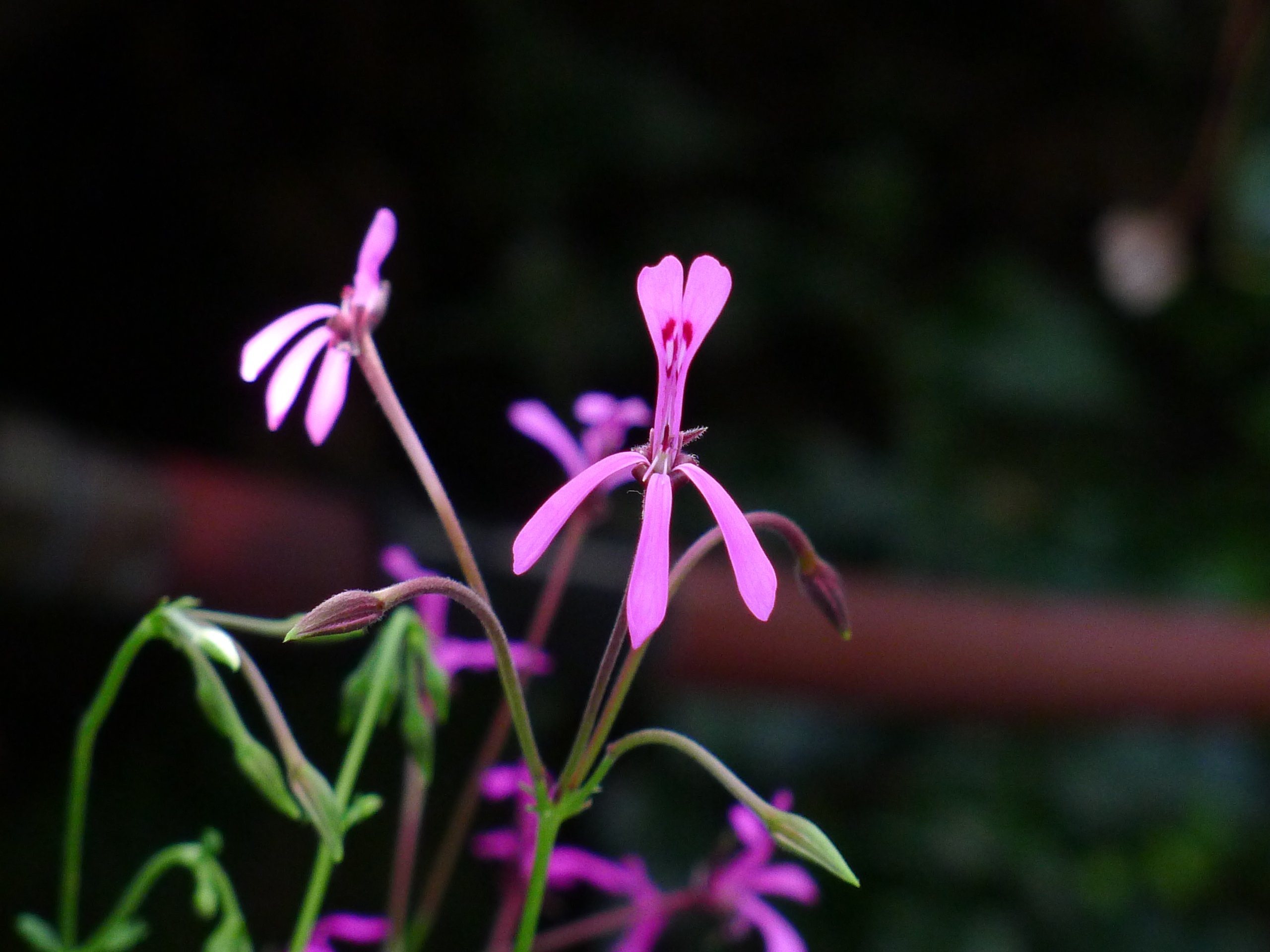
P. ionidiflorum (scented leaf)

- Almond - Pelargonium quercifolium
- Apple - Pelargonium odoratissimum
- Apple - Pelargonium cordifolium
- Apple/Mint - Pelargonium album
- Apricot/Lemon - Pelargonium scabrum
- Balsam - Pelargonium panduriforme
- Camphor - Pelargonium betulinum
- Celery - Pelargonium ionidiflorum
- Cinnamon - Pelargonium 'Ardwyck Cinnamon'
- Coconut - Pelargonium grossalarioides (Pelargonium parriflorum)
- Eau de Cologne - Pelargonium 'Brilliantine'
- Eucalyptus - Pelargonium 'Secret Love'
- Grapefruit - Pelargonium 'Poquita'
- Ginger - Pelargonium 'Torrento' or 'Cola Bottles' which is a variety of Pelargonium x nervosum
- Hazelnut - Pelargonium 'Odorata Hazelnut
- Lavender - Pelargonium 'Lavender Lindy'
- Lemon - Pelargonium crispum
- Lemon - Pelargonium citronellum (Synonym - Pelargonium 'Mabel Grey')
- Lemon Balm - Pelargonium x melissinum
- Lime - Pelargonium x nervosum
- Myrrh - Pelargonium myrrhifolium
- Nutmeg - Pelargonium x fragrans
- Old Spice - Variety of Pelargonium x fragrans
- Orange - Pelargonium x citriodorum (Synonym - Pelargonium 'Prince of Orange')
- Peach - Pelargonium 'Peaches and Cream'
- Peppermint - Pelargonium tomentosum
- Pine - Pelargonium denticulatum
- Pineapple - Pelargonium 'Brilliant'
- Raspberry - Pelargonium 'Red Raspberry'
- Rose - Pelargonium graveolens (Synonym - Pelargonium roseum)
- Rose - Pelargonium capitatum
- Rose - Pelargonium radens
- Southernwood - Pelargonium abrotanifolium
- Spicy - Pelargonium exstipulatum
- Strawberry - Pelargonium x scarboroviae

Cultivars

- 'Attar of Roses' - a cultivar of P. capitatum
- 'Crowfoot Rose' - a cultivar of P. radens
- 'Dr. Livingston' - a cultivar of P. radens
- 'Grey Lady Plymouth' - a cultivar of P. graveolens
- 'Prince Rupert' - a cultivar of P. crispum

==== G. Species pelargoniums ====
The species are the forefathers of all the cultivar groups listed above. In general, the definition of a species is that it breeds true, and is to be found doing this in the "wild". Species pelargoniums have a large diversity of characteristics in habit, shape, size and colour, which probably accounts for them having retained their popularity for more than 300 years.

==== H. Primary hybrids ====
A primary hybrid is recognised as being the resultant plant from a first-time cross between two different known species. Examples are P. × ardens – from P. lobatum × P. fulgidum (1810). P. × glauciifolium – from P. gibbosum × P. lobatum (1822). Primary hybrids are usually, but not always, sterile.

=== List of AGM pelargoniums ===
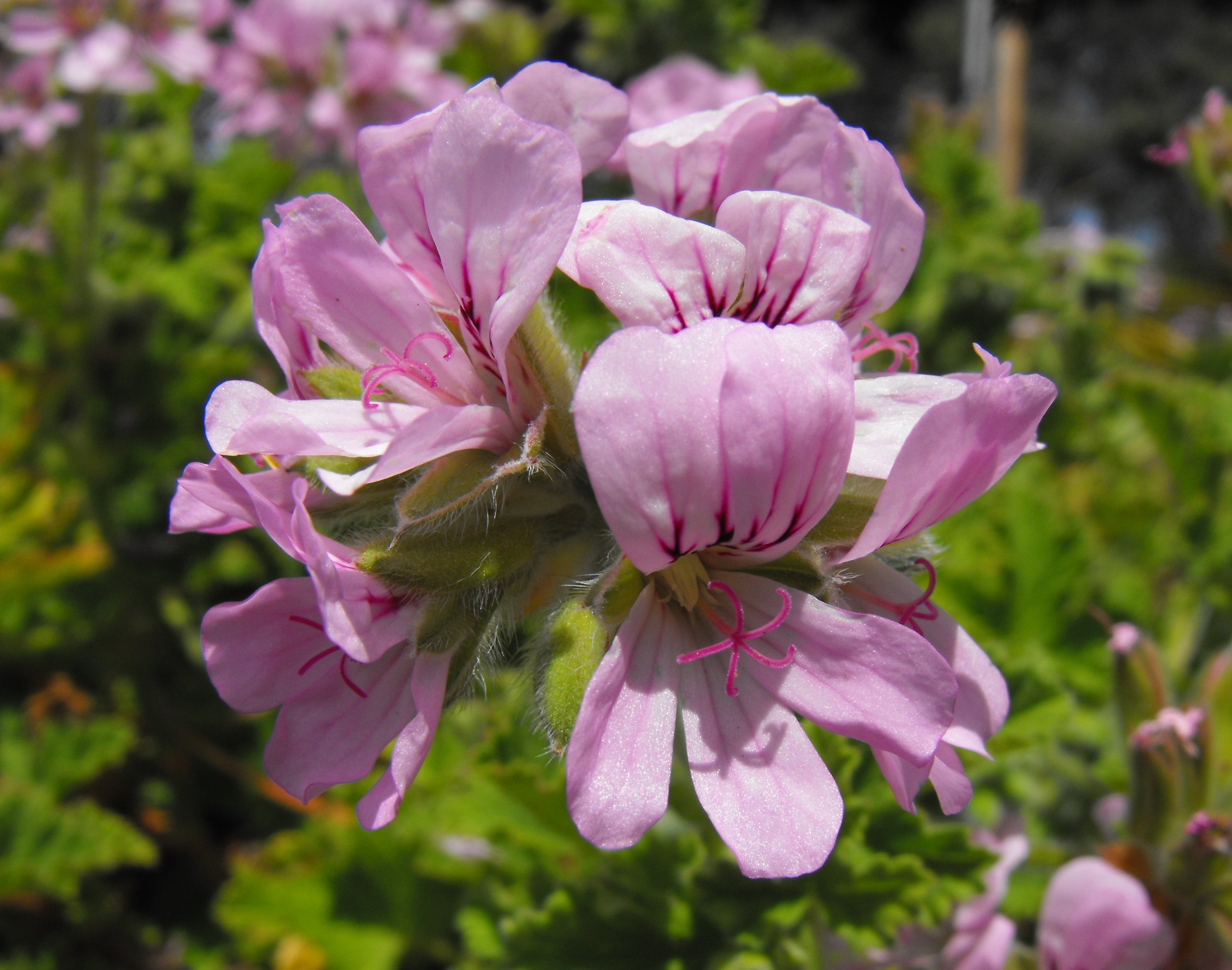
'Attar of Roses'

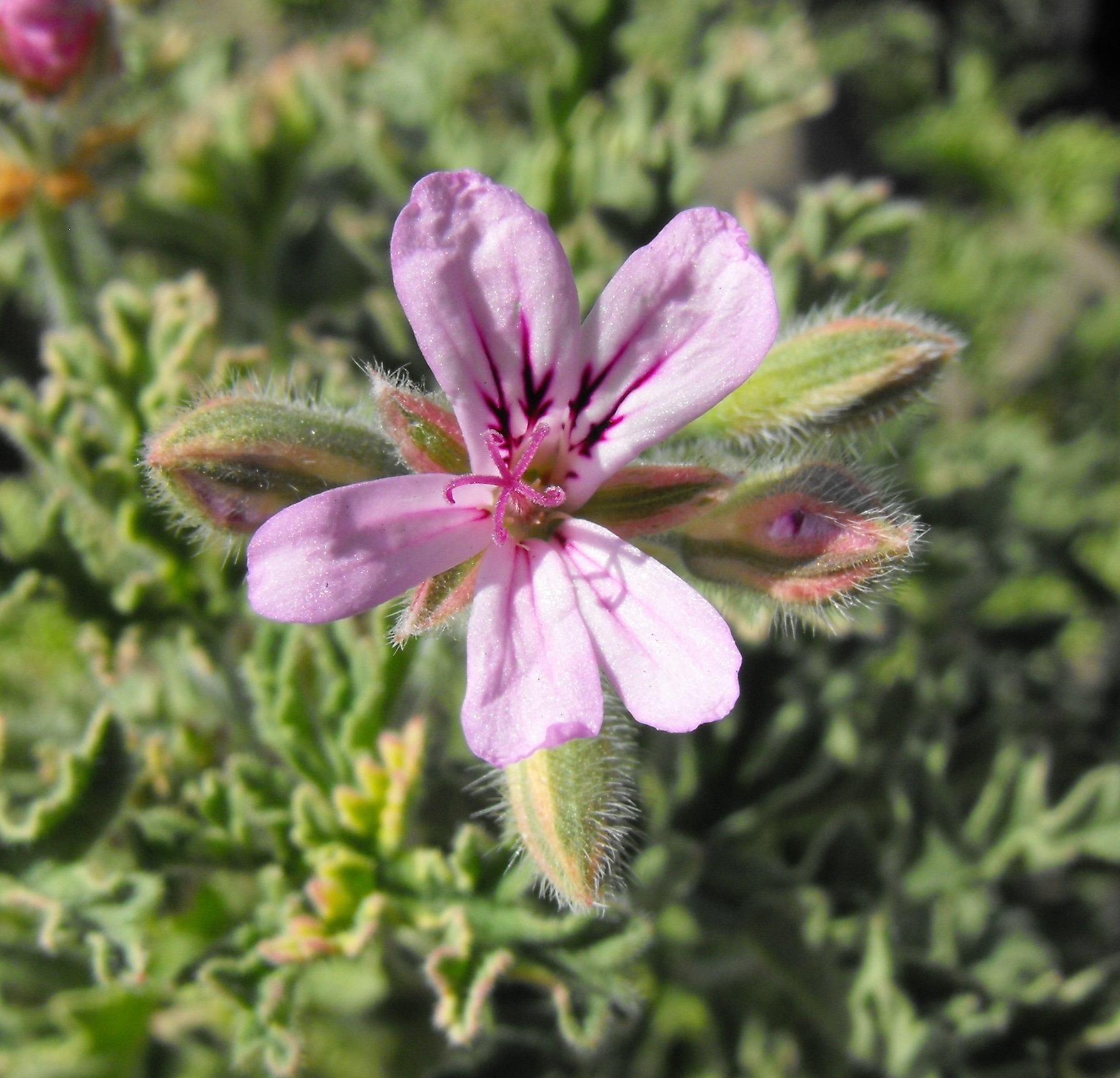
'Lady Plymouth'

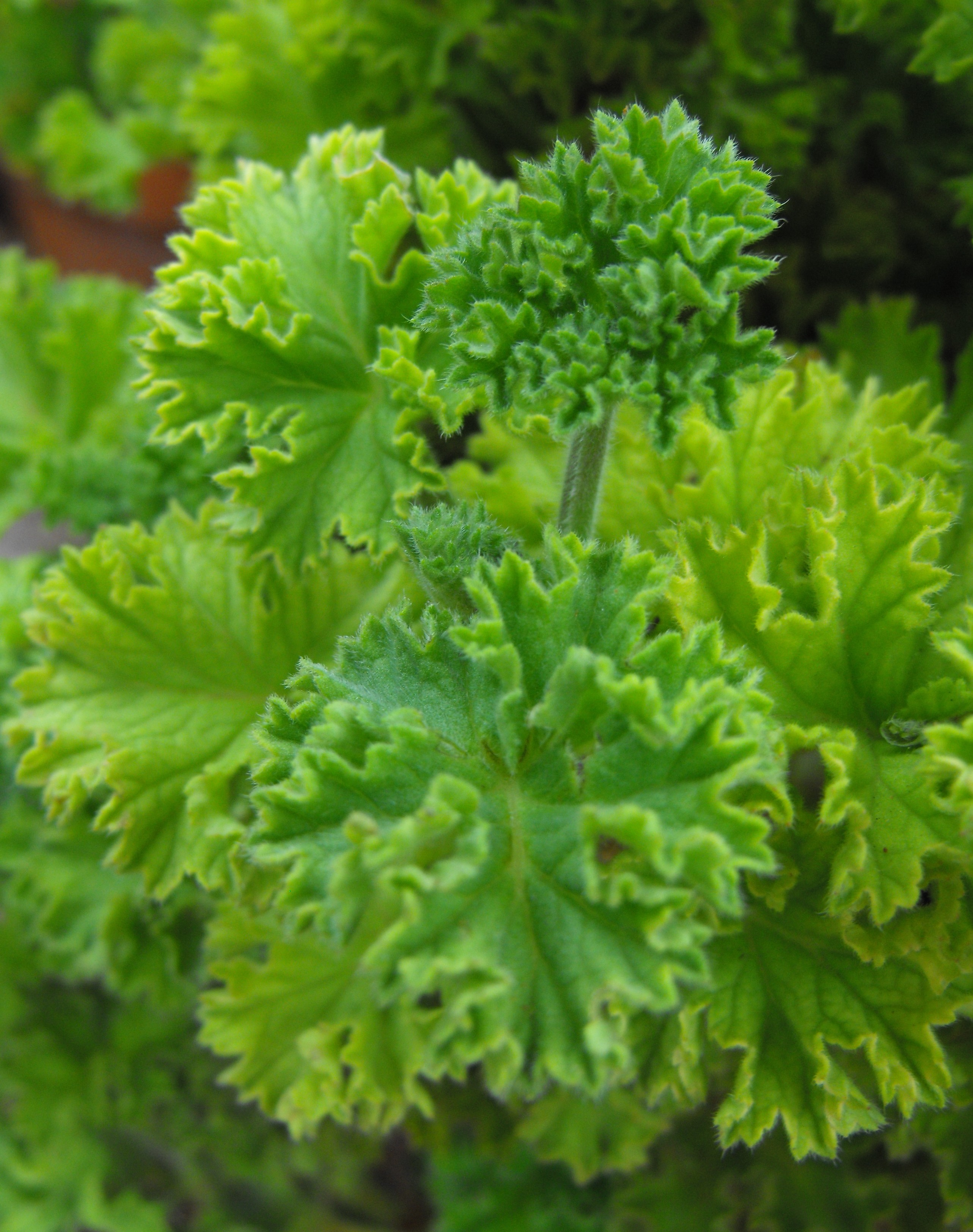
'Mabel Gray'

The following is a selection of pelargoniums which have gained the Royal Horticultural Society's Award of Garden Merit:

- 'Attar of Roses' (rose scented leaves, pink flowers)
- 'Citriodorum' (lemon scented leaves, rose pink flowers)
- 'Dolly Varden' (variegated leaves, scarlet flowers)
- 'Frank Headley' (cream vareigated leaves, salmon pink flowers)
- 'Fringed Aztec' (white & purple fringed flowers)
- 'Gemstone' (scented leaves, pink flowers)
- 'Grace Thomas' (lemon scented leaves, pale pink flowers)
- 'Joy' (pink & white frilled flowers)
- 'Lady Plymouth' (P. graveolens variegata – small mauve flowers)
- 'Lara Candy Dancer' (scented leaves, pale mauve flowers)
- 'Lara Starshine' (aromatic leaves, lilac flowers)
- 'L'Élégante' (ivy-leaved, trailing, white and purple flowers)
- 'Mabel Grey' (lemon-scented leaves, mauve flowers)
- 'Mrs Quilter' (bronze leaves, salmon pink flowers)
- 'Radula' (lemon & rose scented leaves, pink & purple flowers)
- 'Royal Oak' (balsam scented leaves, mauve flowers)
- 'Spanish Angel' (lilac & magenta flowers)
- 'Sweet Mimosa' (balsam-scented leaves, pale pink flowers)
- 'Tip Top Duet' (pink & wine-red flowers)
- 'Voodoo' (crimson & black flowers)
- P. tomentosum (peppermint-scented leaves, small white flowers)

== Uses ==
=== Ornamental plants ===
Pelargoniums rank as one of the highest number of potted flowering plants sold and also in terms of wholesale value.

=== Scented leaf pelargoniums ===
Other than being grown for their beauty, species such as P. graveolens are important in the perfume industry and are cultivated and distilled for their scents. Although scented pelargoniums exist which have smells of citrus, mint, pine, spices or various fruits, the varieties with rose scents are most commercially important. Pelargonium distillates and absolutes, commonly known as "scented geranium oil" are sometimes used to supplement or adulterate expensive rose oils. The oils of the scented pelargoniums contain citronellol, geraniol, eugenol, alpha-pinene and many other compounds. The edible leaves and flowers are also used as a flavouring in desserts, cakes, jellies and teas. Scented-leafed pelargoniums can be used to flavor jellies, cakes, butters, ice cream, iced tea and other dishes, The rose-, lemon- and peppermint-scents are most commonly used. Also used are those with hints of peach, cinnamon and orange. Commonly used lemon-scented culinary species include P. crispum and P. citronellum. Rose-scenteds include P. graveolens and members of the P. graveolens cultivar group. Other species and cultivars with culinary use include the lime-scented P. ‘Lime’, the lemon balm-scented P. 'Lemon Balm', the strawberry-lemon-scented P. ‘Lady Scarborough’ and the peppermint-scented P. tomentosum. Scented leaf pelargoniums have also been historically used as toilet paper by fishermen in remote places, such as the Minquiers.

=== Herbal medicine ===
In herbal medicine, Pelargonium has been used for intestinal problems, wounds and respiratory ailments, but Pelargonium species have also been used for fevers, kidney complaints and other conditions. Geranium (Pelargonium) oil is considered a relaxant in aromatherapy, and in recent years, respiratory/cold remedies made from P. sidoides and P. reniforme have been sold in Europe and the US. P. sidoides along with Echinacea is used for bronchitis. P. odoratissimum is used for its astringent, tonic and antiseptic effects. It is used internally for debility, gastroenteritis, and hemorrhage and externally for skin complaints, injuries, and neuralgia and throat infections. The essential oil is used in aromatherapy.

==== Pets ====
According to the ASPCA, these plants are toxic to cats, dogs, and horses.

=== Chemistry ===
Pelargonin (pelargonidin 3,5-O-diglucoside) is a petal pigment of the scarlet pelargonium.

== In culture ==
Chemist John Dalton realized that he was color blind in 1794 when he heard others describe the color of the flowers of the pink Pelargonium zonale as pink or red, when to him it looked either pink or blue.

== Bibliography ==
=== Books ===
- Bakker, F. T.; Culham, A. & Gibby, M. (1999). "Chapter16. Phylogenetics and diversification in Pelargonium". In Hollingsworth, P.; Bateman, R. & Gornall, R. (eds.). Molecular Systematics and Plant Evolution. CRC Press. pp. 353–374. doi:10.1201/9781439833278.ch16 (inactive 6 June 2026). ISBN 978-0-7484-0908-2.
- Boddy, Kasia (2013). Geranium. London: Reaktion Books. ISBN 9781780230580.
- Butterfield, Harry Morton (1953). Geraniums and pelargoniums for the home garden. Berkeley: University of California.
- Lis-Balchin, Maria, ed. (2002). Geranium and pelargonium: the genera geranium and pelargonium. London: Taylor & Francis. ISBN 978-0-415-28487-5.
- Mabberley, David J (2013). "Pelargonium". Mabberley's Plant-Book (3 ed.). Cambridge University Press. p. 641. ISBN 978-1107782594.
- Taylor, Judith M. (2014). Visions of Loveliness: Great Flower Breeders of the Past. Ohio University Press. ISBN 9780804040624.
- van der Walt & Vorster (1971–1988). Pelargoniums of Southern Africa (3 vols). Illustrated by Ellaphie Ward-Hilhorst. Cape Town & Johannesburg: Purnell.
- Wilkinson, Ann (2007). The Passion for Pelargoniums. How They Found Their Place in the Garden. Stroud: The History Press. ISBN 9780752496061.

==== Historical ====
- Dillenius, Johann Jakob (1732). Hortus Elthamensis seu Plantarum Rariorum ... (in Latin). London: Sumptibus Auctoris. Archived from the original on 4 March 2016.
  - Hortus Elthamensis on Gallica
- Linnaeus, Carl (1753). Species Plantarum, ... (in Latin). Stockholm: Impensis Laurentii Salvii. doi:10.5962/bhl.title.669.
- Sweet, Robert (1822). Geraniaceae: The Natural Order of Gerania. Vol. I. Piccadilly: James Ridgeway. doi:10.5962/bhl.title.102247. hdl:2027/gri.ark:/13960/t61580v6m.
- Dauthenay, Henri (1897). Les Géraniums (Pelargonium zonale & inquinans): description et culture ... (in French). Paris: Octave Doin.
- Bailey, L.H. (1906) [1900]. The Cyclopedia of American Horticulture (4 vols.) (5th ed.). New York: Macmillan. doi:10.5962/bhl.title.29309.
- Bailey, L.H. (1919) [1900]. The Standard Cyclopedia of Horticulture (6 vols.) (3rd ed.). New York: Macmillan. doi:10.5962/bhl.title.23351.

=== Articles and theses ===
- Aedo, Carlos & Garmendia, Félix Muñoz (Feb 1996). "Some Notes on the Sectional Nomenclature of Geranium (Geraniaceae)". Taxon. 45 (1): 104–106. Bibcode:1996Taxon..45..104A. doi:10.2307/1222593. JSTOR 1222593.
- Bakker, Freek T.; Culham, Alastair; Pankhurst, Clive E. & Gibby, Mary (May 2000). "Mitochondrial and chloroplast DNA-based phylogeny of Pelargonium (Geraniaceae)". Am. J. Bot. 87 (5): 727–734. doi:10.2307/2656859. JSTOR 2656859. PMID 10811797.
- Bakker, Freek T.; Culham, Alastair; Hettiarachi, Priyani; Touloumenidou, Tasoula & Gibby, Mary (Feb 2004). "Phylogeny of Pelargonium (Geraniaceae) based on DNA sequences from three genomes". Taxon. 53 (1): 17–28. Bibcode:2004Taxon..53Q..17B. doi:10.2307/4135485. JSTOR 4135485.
- Lalli, Jacqueline Yolande Yvette (2005). In Vitro Pharmacological Properties and Composition of Leaf Essential Oils and Extracts of Selected Indigenous Pelargonium (Geraniaceae) Species (PDF) (MPharm). University of the Witwatersrand.
- Röschenbleck, J; Albers, F; Müller, K; Weinl, S & Kudla, J (11 February 2014). "Phylogenetics, character evolution and a subgeneric revision of the genus Pelargonium (Geraniaceae)" (PDF). Phytotaxa. 159 (2): 31–76. Bibcode:2014Phytx.159...31R. doi:10.11646/phytotaxa.159.2.1.
- van der Walt, J.J.A. (1979). "Notes on the nomenclature of Pelargonium Geraniaceae". Journal of South African Botany. 45 (3): 377–380. doi:10.5962/p.396918.
- van der Walt, J.J.A. & Vorster, P.J. (February 1981). "Typification of the Genus Pelargonium L'Hérit. (Fam. Geraniaceae)". Taxon. 30 (1): 307. Bibcode:1981Taxon..30..307V. doi:10.2307/1219408. JSTOR 1219408.

=== Societies ===
- ISHS (2015). "International Society for Horticultural Science".
- RHS (2015). "Royal Horticultural Society".
- PAGS (2023). "The Pelargonium & Geranium Society".
- AGS (2014). "Australian Geranium Society".
- HSA (2015). "The Herb Society of America" (PDF). Archived from the original on 24 September 2015.**
- Amadio, Marisa (2015). "The Geraniaceae Group".
