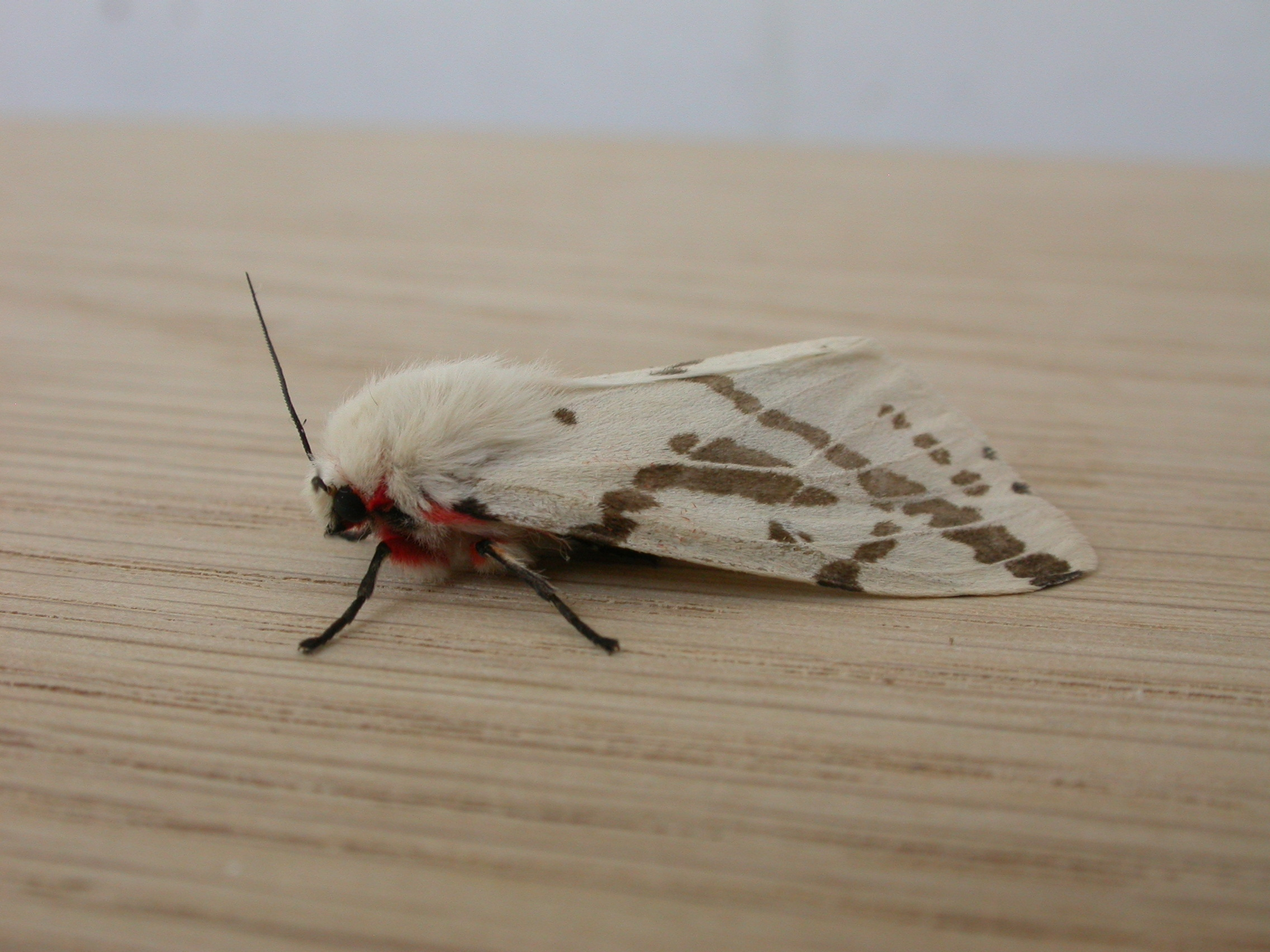
- Female imago
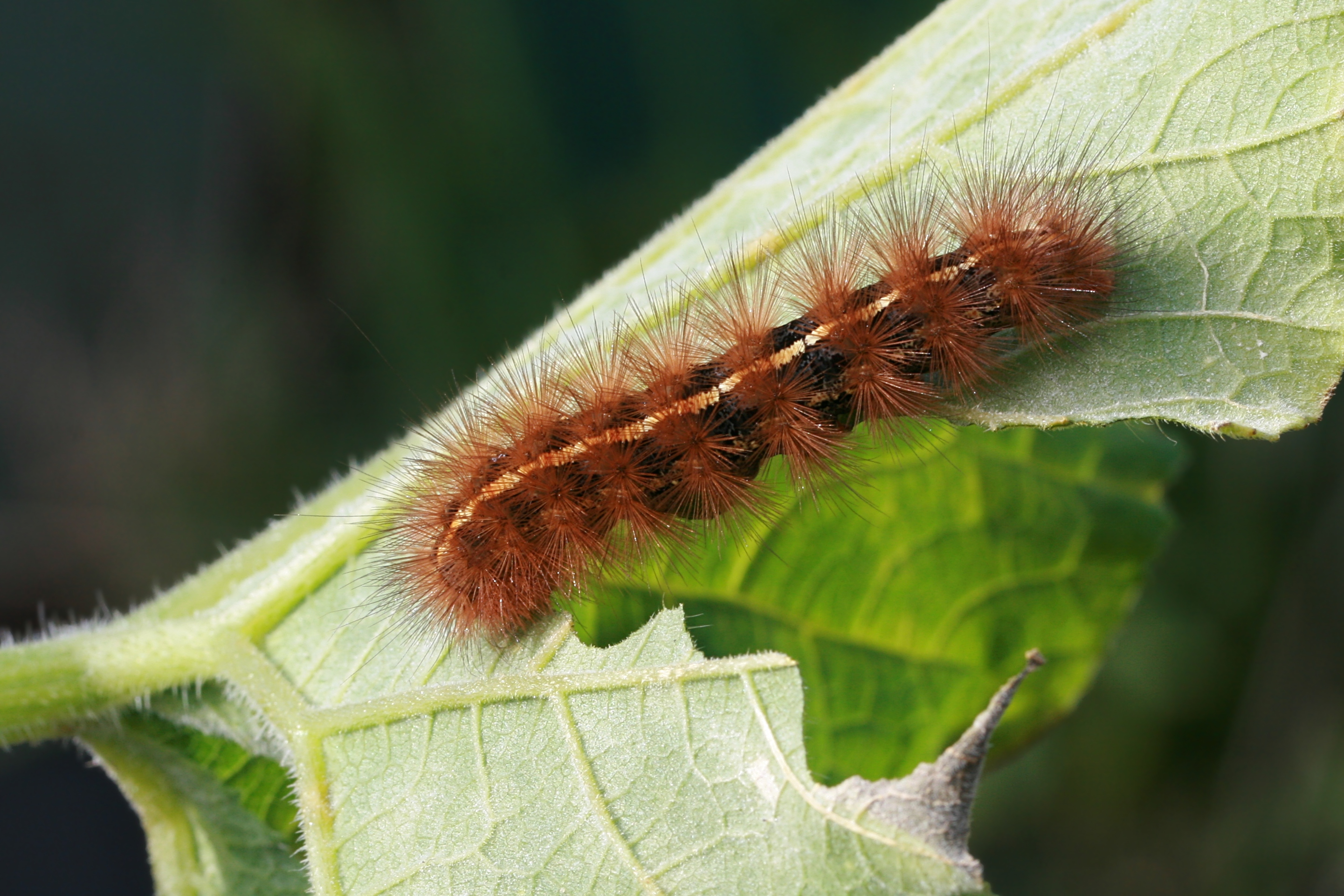
- Larva

Scientific classification
- Kingdom: Animalia
- Phylum: Arthropoda
- Clade: Pancrustacea
- Class: Insecta
- Order: Lepidoptera
- Superfamily: Noctuoidea
- Family: Erebidae
- Subfamily: Arctiinae
- Genus: Ardices
- Species: A. canescens

Binomial name
- Ardices canescens Butler, 1875

Synonyms
- Spilosoma canescens (Butler, 1875)

= Ardices canescens =

Species of moth

Ardices canescens, the dark-spotted tiger moth or light ermine moth, is a moth in the family Erebidae that is found across most of Australia. It originally was included in the genus Spilosoma, but later the generic status of Ardices was proven.

The larvae are polyphagous, and are known to feed on Bidens pilosa, Helianthus annuus, Taraxacum officinale, Ipomoea batatas, Alcea rosea, Rosa odorata, Plantago, Ricinus communis and Tradescantia albiflora. The polyembryonic parasitoid wasp Copidosoma floridanum sometimes uses this species of caterpillar as a host.
