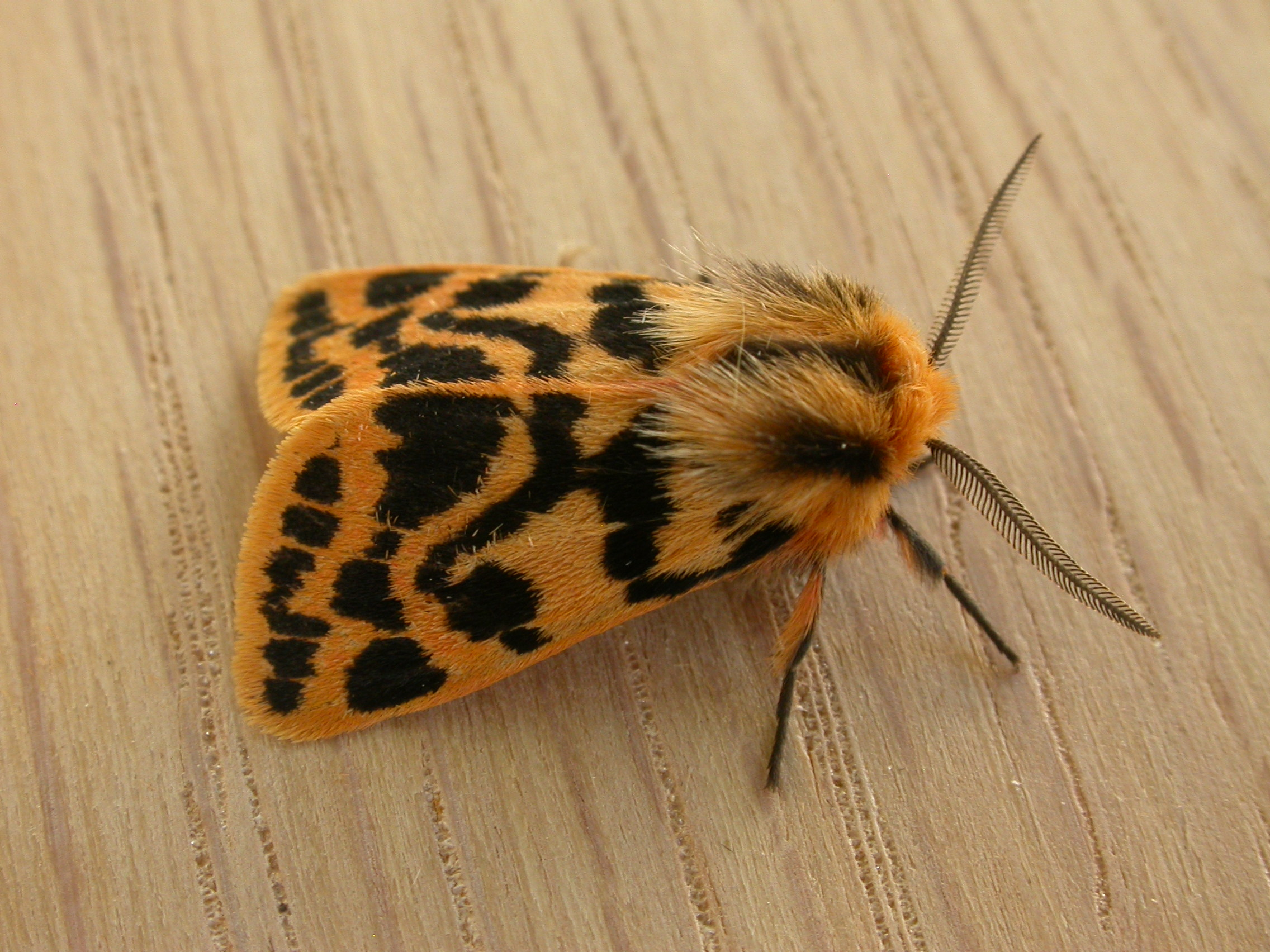

Scientific classification
- Domain: Eukaryota
- Kingdom: Animalia
- Phylum: Arthropoda
- Class: Insecta
- Order: Lepidoptera
- Superfamily: Noctuoidea
- Family: Erebidae
- Subfamily: Arctiinae
- Genus: Ardices
- Species: A. curvata

Binomial name
- Ardices curvata (Donovan, 1805)

Synonyms
- Spilosoma curvata

= Ardices curvata =

Crimson tiger moth

Species of moth

Ardices curvata, the crimson tiger moth, is a moth of the family Erebidae. It was first described by Edward Donovan in 1805 and it is found in Australia. The species was formerly included in Spilosoma, but later generic status of Ardices was proved by Vladimir Viktorovitch Dubatolov (2005).

The larvae feed on Taraxacum officinale, Phaseolus vulgaris, Pelargonium zonale and Tropaeolum majus.
