= Penetrant =

Penetrant may refer to:

- Penetrant (biochemical), a chemical that increases the ability of a poison to apply its toxic effect to a living organism
- Penetrant (mechanical, electrical, or structural), service of structural item penetrating a fire-resistance rated wall or floor assembly
- Penetrating oil, lubricant

== See also ==
- Liquid penetrant, medium for Dye penetrant inspection
- Penetrance, in genetics, is the proportion of individuals carrying a particular variant of a gene
