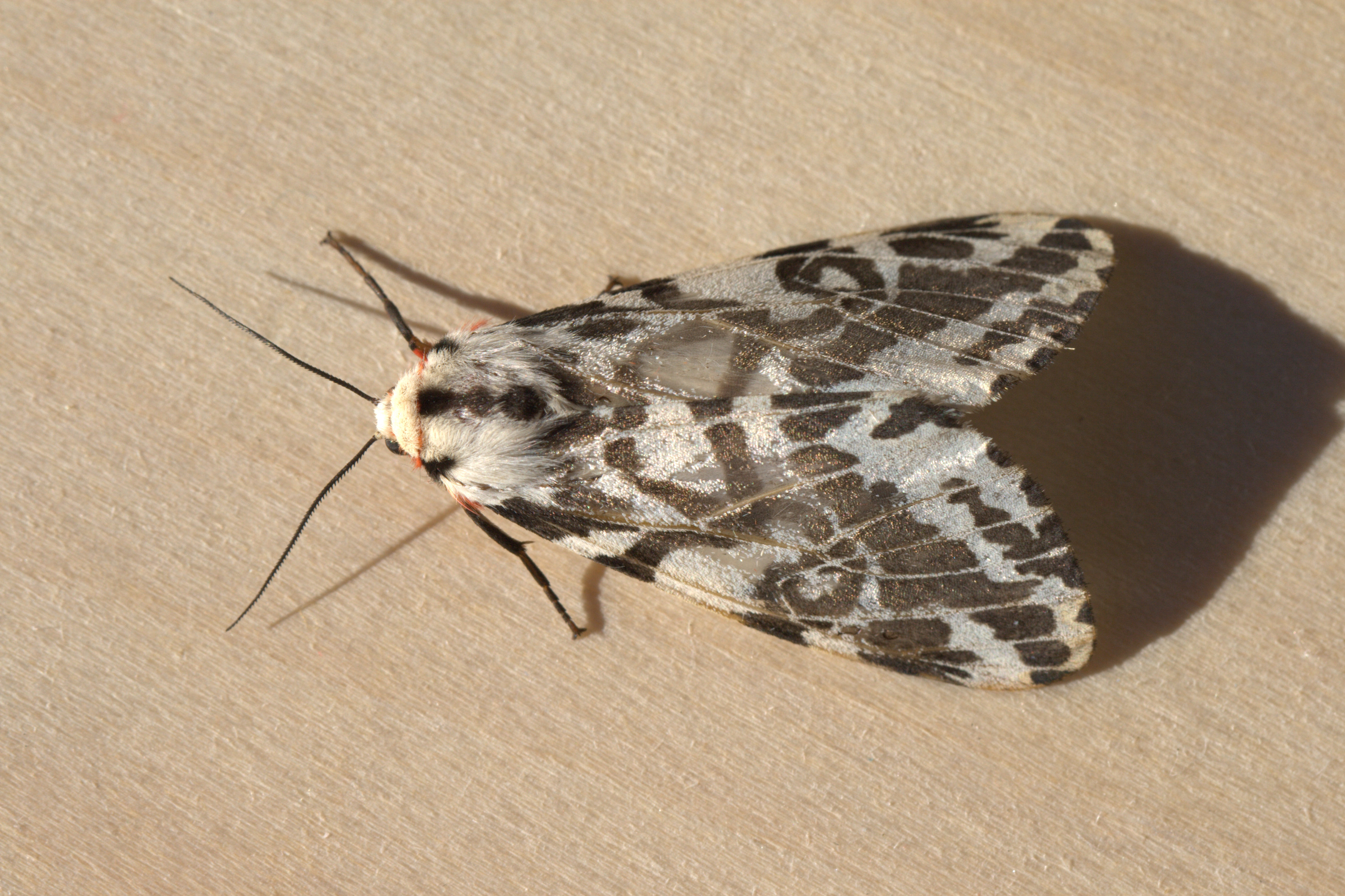
- Adult moth
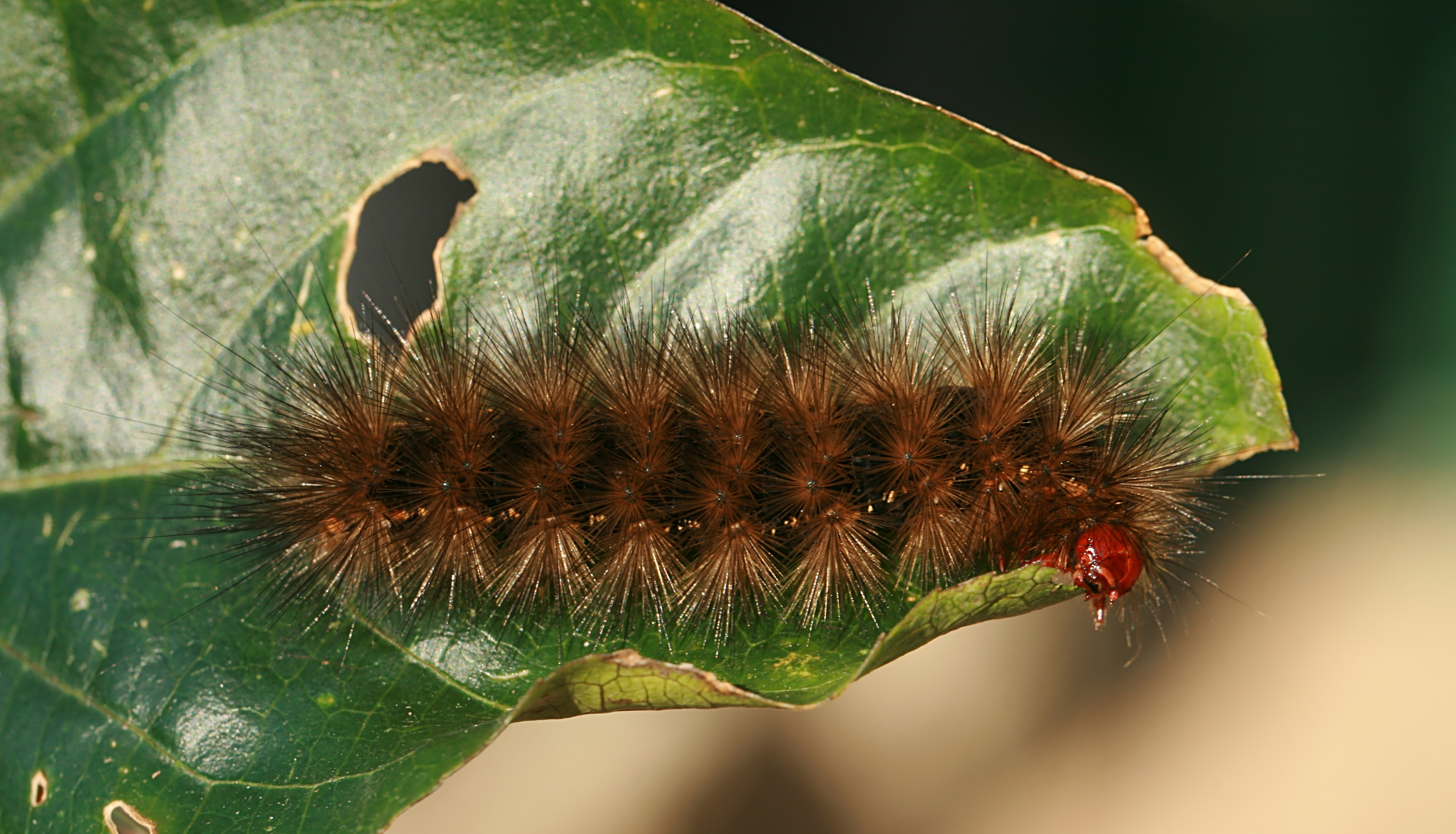
- Larva

Scientific classification
- Domain: Eukaryota
- Kingdom: Animalia
- Phylum: Arthropoda
- Class: Insecta
- Order: Lepidoptera
- Superfamily: Noctuoidea
- Family: Erebidae
- Subfamily: Arctiinae
- Genus: Ardices
- Species: A. glatignyi

Binomial name
- Ardices glatignyi (Le Guillemot)

Synonyms
- Chelonia glatignyi Le Guillou, 1841; Spilosoma glatignyi; Spilarctia glatignyi; Chelonia pallida Doubleday, 1845; Arcides fulvohirta Walker, 1855; Spilosoma subocellatum Walker, 1856; Spilosoma conferta Walker, 1865; Arcides garida Swinhoe, 1892; Diacrisia garida; Spilosoma queenslandi Lucas, 1898; Diacrisia meridionalis Rothschild, 1910; Arcides suffusa Rothschild, 1914; Maenas fremantlei Strand, 1924

= Ardices glatignyi =

Black and white tiger moth

Species of moth

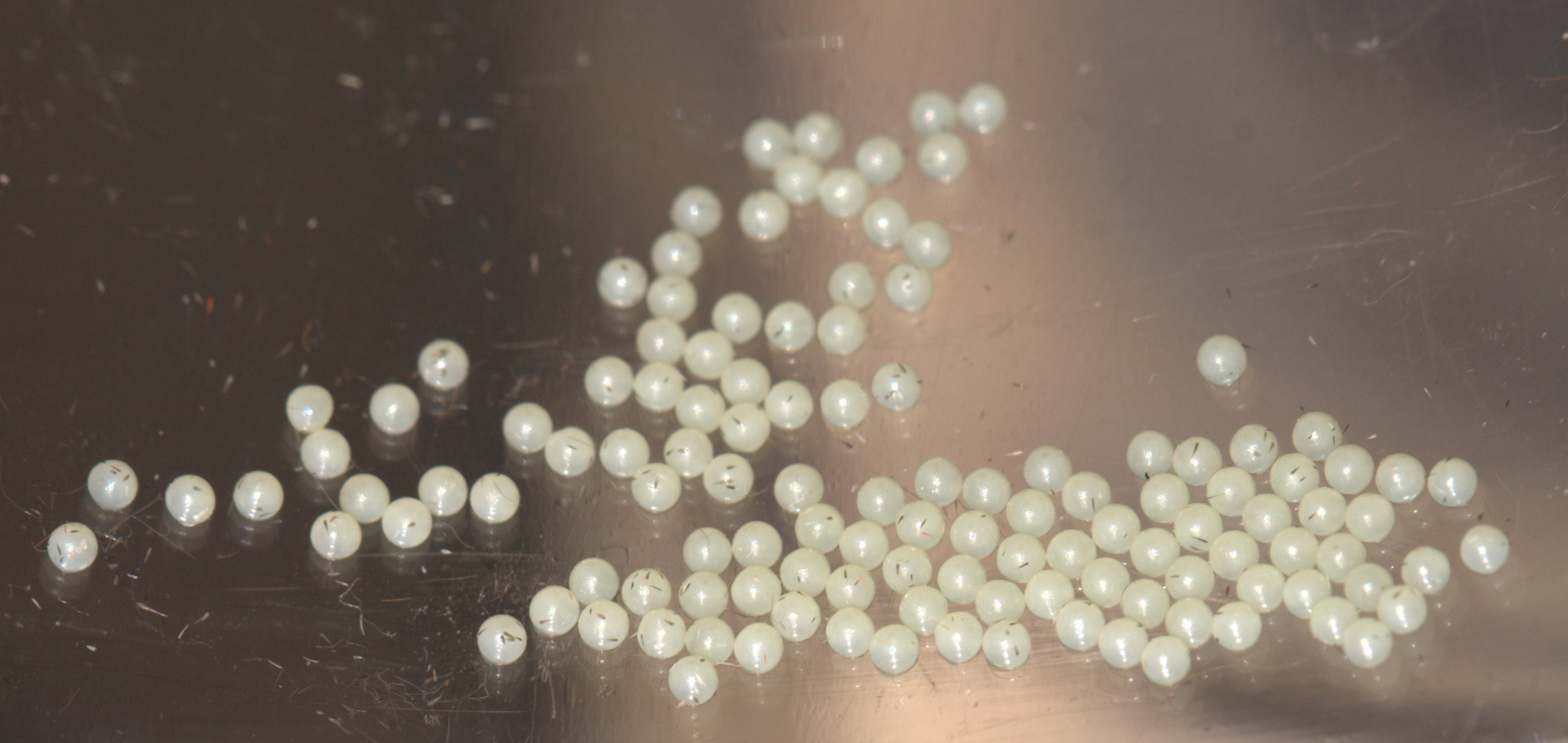
Eggs

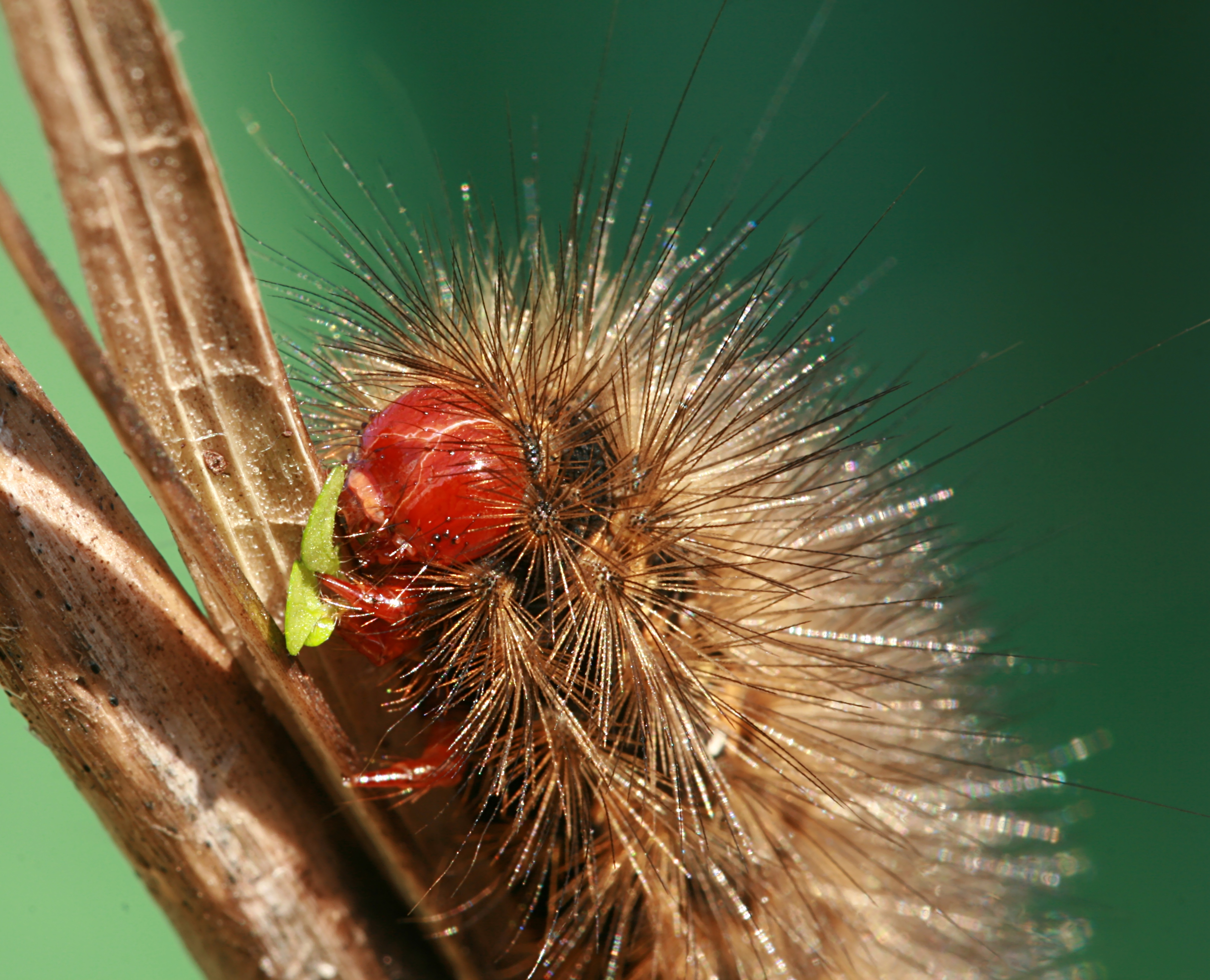
Profile of the caterpillar

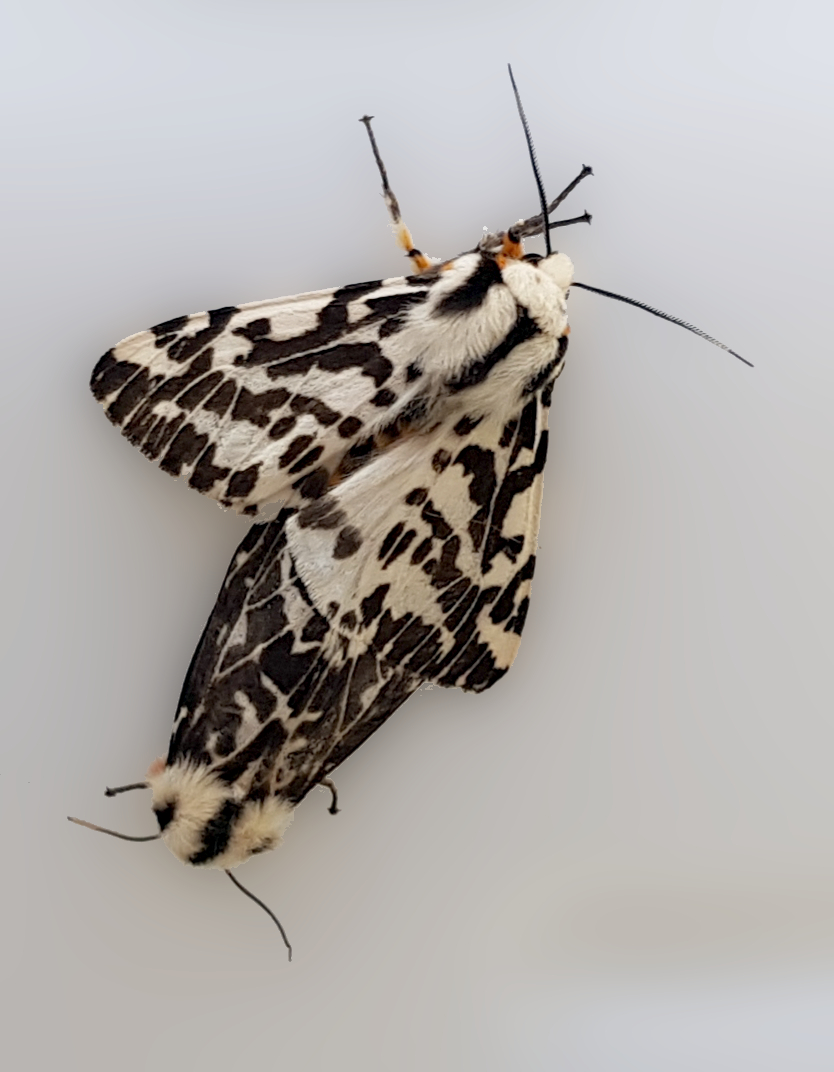
Mating

Ardices glatignyi, the black and white tiger moth, is a moth in the family Erebidae that is found in Australia. The species was first described by Le Guillou in 1841. Formerly included in Spilosoma, but later generic status of Ardices was proved by Vladimir Viktorovitch Dubatolov (2005). The larvae are polyphagous, and are known to feed on Lantana camara, Acanthus mollis, and Tradescantia albiflora.
