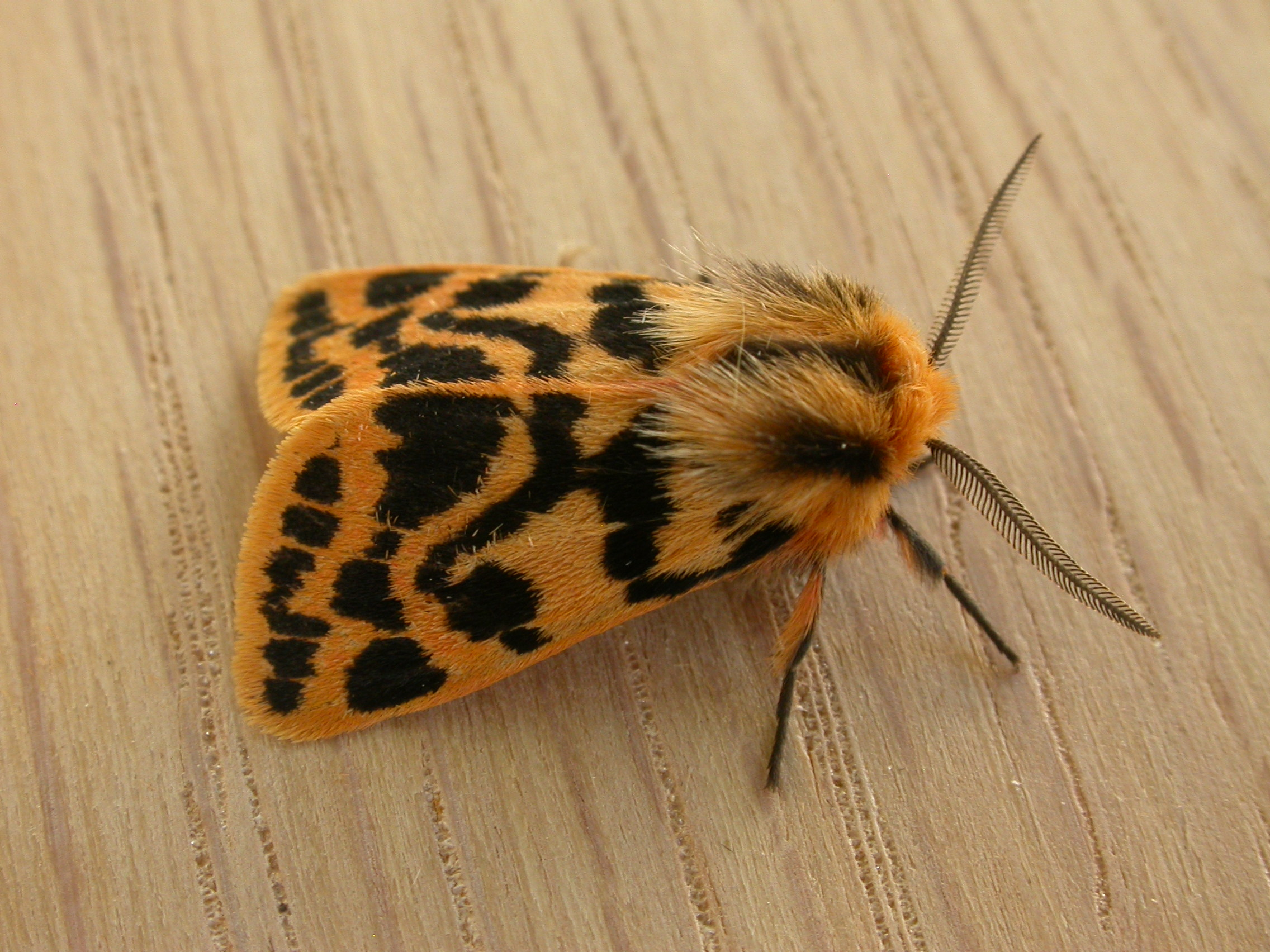

Scientific classification
- Kingdom: Animalia
- Phylum: Arthropoda
- Class: Insecta
- Order: Lepidoptera
- Superfamily: Noctuoidea
- Family: Erebidae
- Subfamily: Arctiinae
- Subtribe: Spilosomina
- Genus: Ardices; Walker, 1855

Type species
- Ardices fulvohirta Walker, 1855

= Ardices =

Genus of moths

Ardices is a genus of tiger moths in the family Erebidae. The genus was erected by Francis Walker in 1855 and the moths are found in Australia.

== Species ==
- Ardices canescens Butler, 1875
- Ardices glatignyi (Le Guillou, 1841)

Subgenus Australemyra Dubatolov, 2005

- Ardices curvata (Donovan, 1805)
