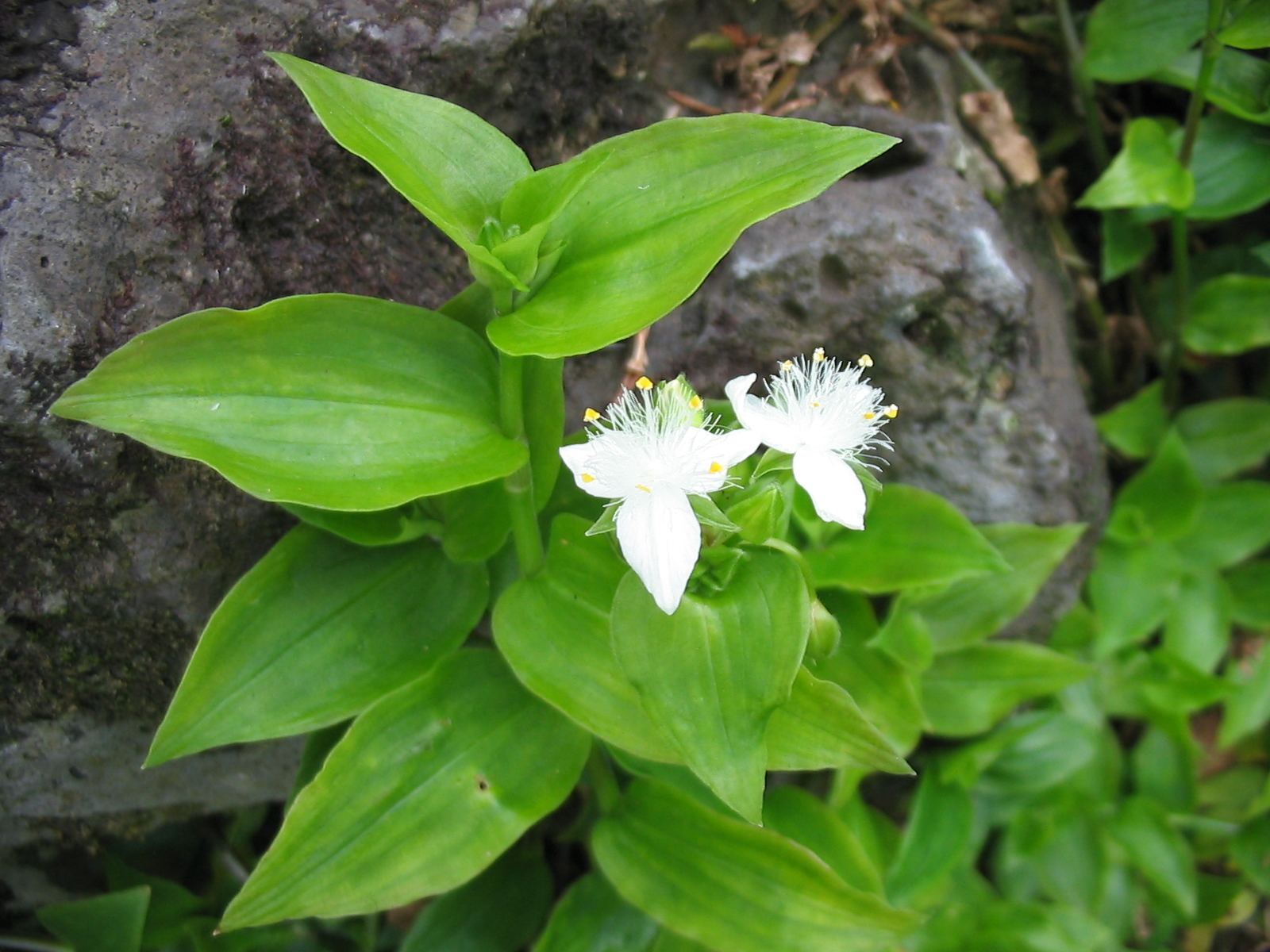

Scientific classification
- Kingdom: Plantae
- Clade: Tracheophytes
- Clade: Angiosperms
- Clade: Monocots
- Clade: Commelinids
- Order: Commelinales
- Family: Commelinaceae
- Genus: Tradescantia
- Species: T. fluminensis

Binomial name
- Tradescantia fluminensis Vell.

Synonyms
- Tradescantia albiflora

= Tradescantia fluminensis =

Species of flowering plant

Tradescantia fluminensis is a species of spiderwort native to South America. It is one of several plants known by the common name wandering Jew. It is also known as small-leaf spiderwort, river spiderwort, inch plant, speedy Henry, wandering willie and wandering trad.

== Names ==
The genus is named after the English naturalists and explorers John Tradescant the Elder (c. 1570s – 1638) and John Tradescant the Younger (1608–1662).

The Latin specific epithet fluminensis refers to those born in Rio de Janeiro, Brazil. The common name wandering Jew refers both to the wandering habit of several species within Tradescantia, and also to a character from early Christian mythology.

== Description ==
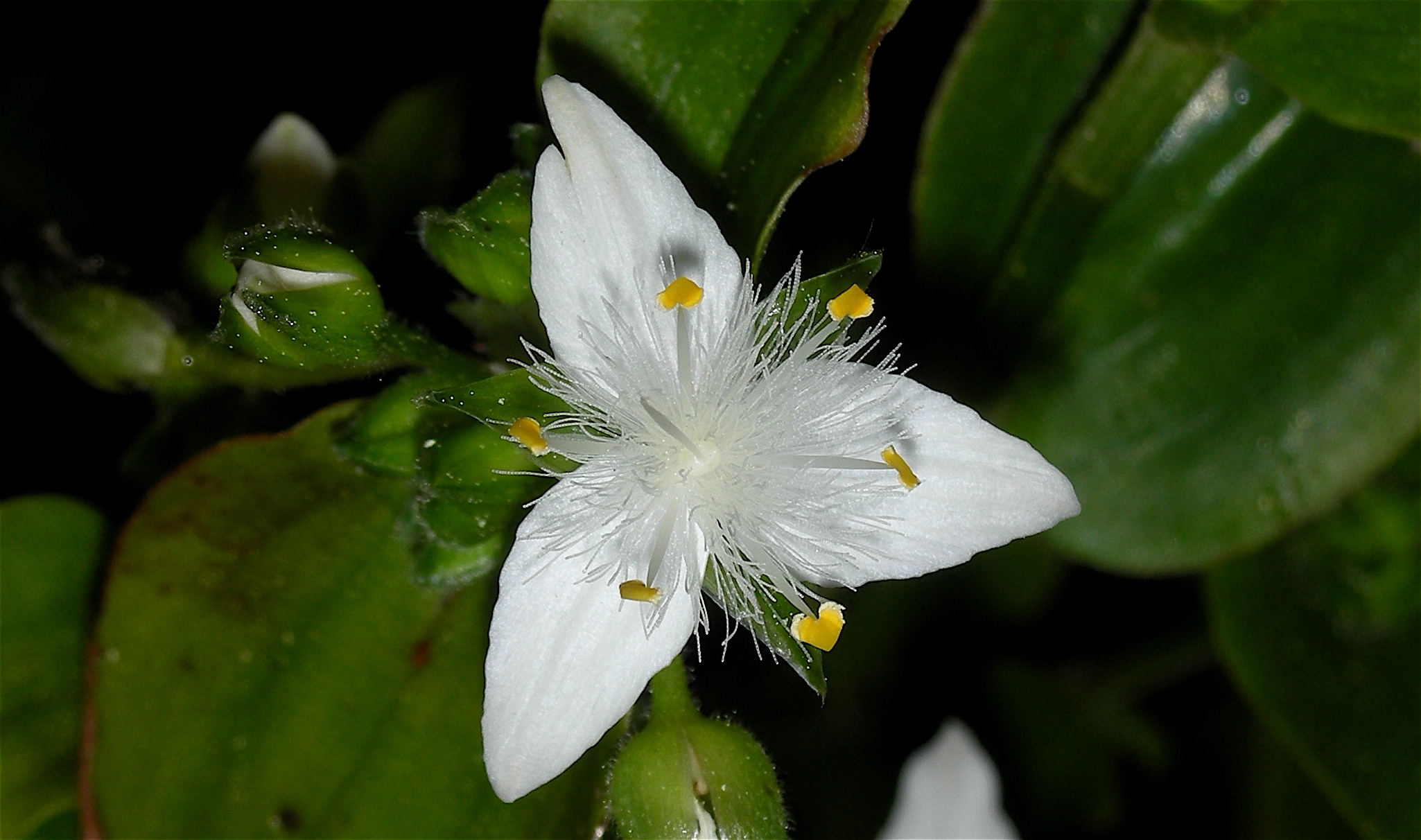
Flower close up

Tradescantia fluminensis is a perennial groundcover that spreads along the ground with soft, hairless stems and leaves. The fleshy stems root at any node that is on the surface. The plant has oval, dark-green leaves with pointed tips that are shiny, smooth and slightly fleshy about 1.25–2.5 inches (32–64 mm) long.

The white flowers are terminal, sometimes opposite a leaf, and are on a 1.5 cm long stem. The flowers have three petals and approx. 0.5–1 inch (13–25 mm) in diameter. The sepals are 5–7 mm in size. The three white petals are 8–9 mm in size. The anthers are detached. The flowers are produced in small clusters in summer and the flowers can make several seeds.

== Cultivation ==
Tradescantia fluminensis is grown as a garden plant or houseplant in many places. Even in places where it is a pest it may be grown as a house plant in variegated forms. The plant requires a moist soil to do well but is retarded by cold climates, especially where there is frost or snow. It tolerates heavy shade. Because it requires moisture it grows weakly, if at all, in sunny areas that dry out for long periods. However, because it is a fleshy plant that retains water, it can withstand extended periods of dryness only to resume growth once better conditions return.

Tradescantia fluminensis is toxic to dogs, cats, and horses, causing dermatitis according to ASPCA.

Numerous cultivars are available with variegated leaves, of which 'Quicksilver' has gained the Royal Horticultural Society's Award of Garden Merit.

== Invasion as a pest ==
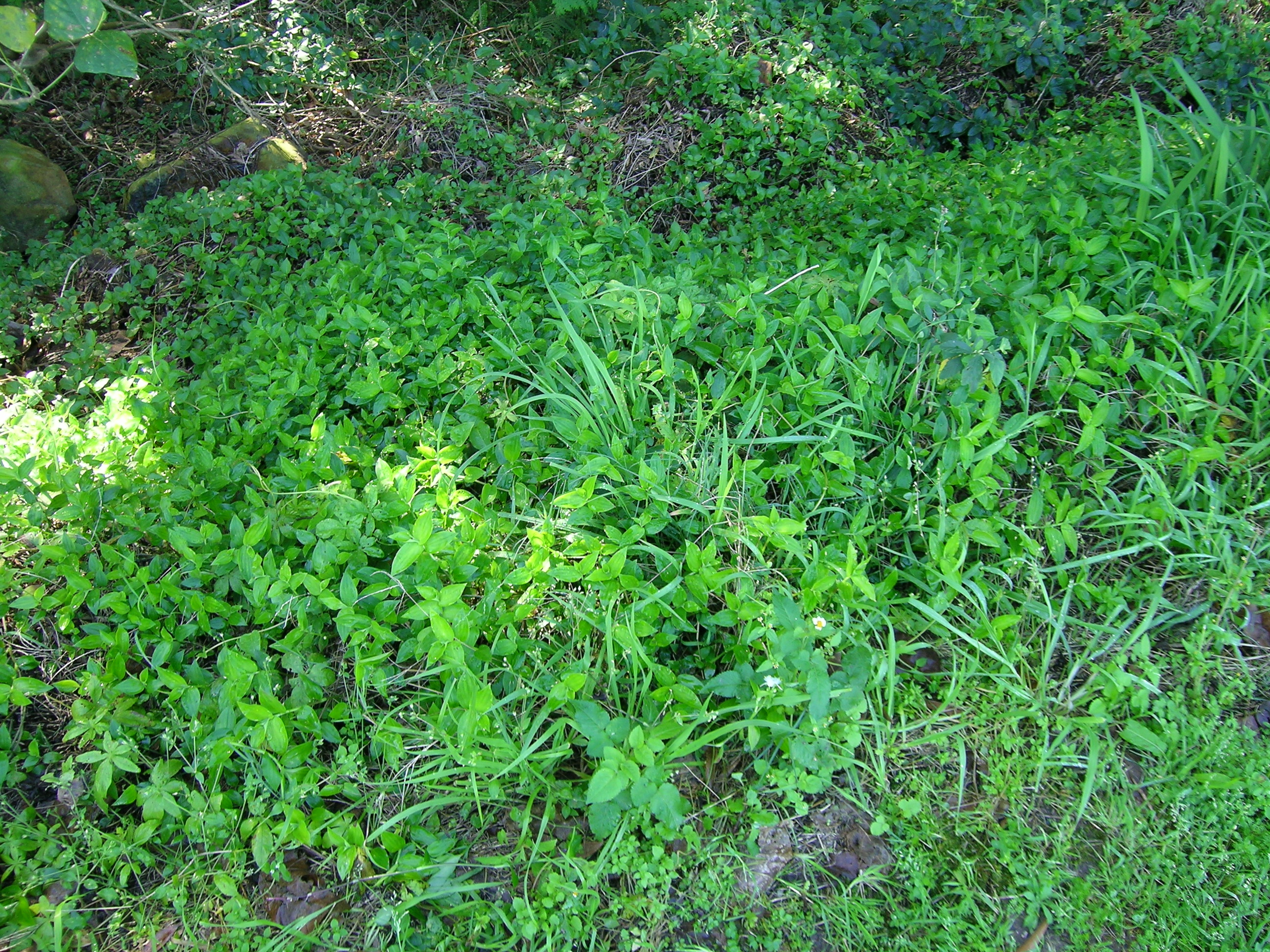
An extensive infestation of Tradescantia fluminensis in Australia.

Tradescantia fluminensis is considered an invasive species, noxious weed, or pest plant in many places and is consequently targeted for eradication. Seriously affected areas include Australia, New Zealand, the southeastern United States. and Portugal (including the Azores and Madeira)

It is classified as a Category 1b Invasive Species in South Africa, and thus in South Africa it may no longer be planted, propagated, or be allowed to disperse, and all trade in their seeds, cuttings or other propagative material is prohibited, in both rural and urban areas.

The seriously invasive qualities of T. fluminensis result from a combination of attributes. Forming a dense mat underneath forest tree cover to 12 inches (30 centimeters) or even more (facilitated by a remarkable shade tolerance) it smothers ground-level plants and prevents the natural regeneration of taller species and, if left unchecked, it can lead to the destruction of native forests.

Even where the climate does not permit T. fluminensis to take root, it still can spread rapidly from being transported by animals and humans and even strong winds. The succulent stems break easily at the nodes and establish themselves wherever they land on moist soil. While T. fluminensis does respond to herbicides and other applied weed controls, each segment has the ability to regenerate, so it is able to make a rapid comeback, especially in soft soils where stems may remain underneath the surface.

== Eradication methods ==
=== Chemical control ===
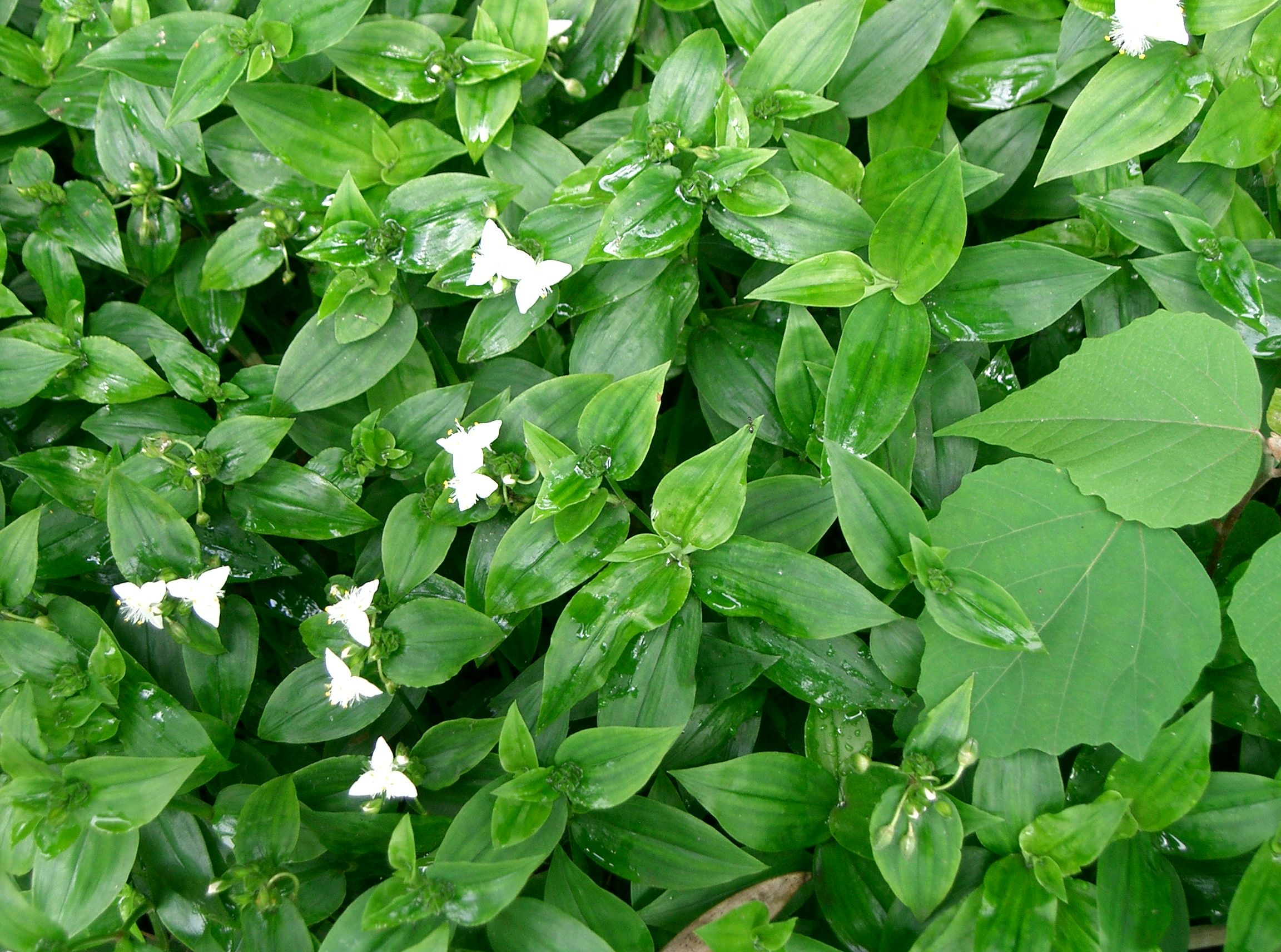
Mat-forming growth

The plant is resistant to chemical control as a result of its glossy leaves and smooth stems, along with its ability to regenerate from small surviving pieces. Nevertheless, for large infested areas this is probably the only means of achieving control. Unfortunately, any chemical that is capable of killing the plant is likely to kill most other plants and so a clear area will result for a period of time. However, since there are treatments that rapidly degrade upon soil contact within a day, this effect is limited to the time that it takes for seeds of other species to germinate and establish themselves. Because of the waxy surface of leaves and stems, a penetrant is needed for effective treatment.

Successful treatments include the following:

- triclopyr or fluoroxypyr (marketed under various brand names) plus a penetrant such as the organosilicone called modified polydimethylsiloxane (e.g. Pulse)

Chemical treatment will result in browning off in 3–4 weeks followed by disappearance of living material. However, follow-up is needed several months later (in a frost free climate) to catch any buried plant segments that may have regenerated and possibly a third such spot treatment is required before the area is completely eradicated and even after that attention to a resurgence is advised.

=== Non-chemical control ===
Repeated deployment of weed-control agents may have a negative effect upon the local environment, in which case the only option remaining is manual clearance. In areas where the plant is a pest this is an arduous task since every single scrap of the weed has to be removed or it will regrow. In less prolific areas, manual removal is less difficult as the plant roots come up easily, and an initial clearance can be accomplished by raking the area. Repeated efforts at intervals of a few months along with regular monitoring for invasion from neighbouring areas will be necessary for full control.

In view of the persistence of the plant and the cost of chemical treatment plus the negative effect on other species, especially in regions where it is a pest, a combination of an initial chemical treatment followed by manual removal for the second or possibly third treatment is worth considering. Nevertheless, absolutely scrupulous attention to the removal of every single piece of the stems from both above and below the surface is required before elimination can be assured.

There are anecdotal reports of using browsing animals (e.g. sheep) to control the plant. Heavy stocking is suggested to ensure all the infestation is consumed, and as with other methods, ongoing monitoring is required to ensure no scraps of plant material have survived to re-infest the area. For residential properties, chickens are an excellent method to control and remove Tradescantia fluminensis, as they will feed on all parts of the plant.

CSIRO has been testing biological control with the leaf-smut fungus Kordyana brasiliensis, in New South Wales and the Dandenong Ranges in Victoria since 2019.
