= Penetrant (biochemical) =

A biochemical penetrant is a chemical that increases the ability of a poison to apply its toxic effect to a living organism.

Typically, the term penetrant when used for a biochemical agent, relates to an agrichemical that is used with a weedkiller or fungicide. The term seems to be used in relation to agrichemicals within English speaking countries rather than North American.

When mixed with a weedkiller (normally as an aqua solution) the penetrant chemical causes a plant to absorb the poison in a more effective manner and so succumb more readily. Penetrants are most often used against plants that would otherwise be able to resist the weedkiller. Often such plants have tough leaves or shiny leaves that shed water easily.

== See also ==
- Surfactant
