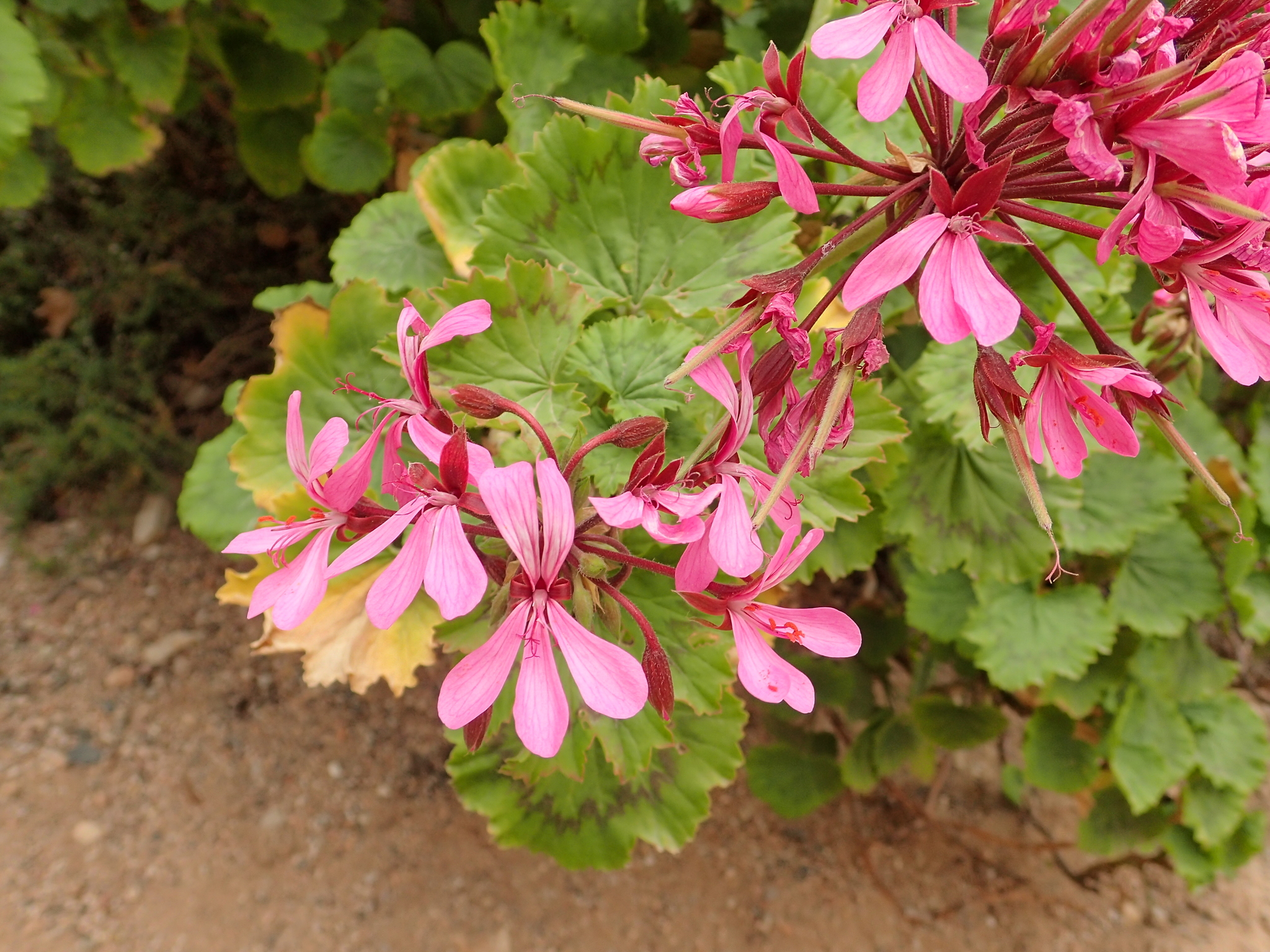
- In South Africa

Scientific classification
- Kingdom: Plantae
- Clade: Tracheophytes
- Clade: Angiosperms
- Clade: Eudicots
- Clade: Rosids
- Order: Geraniales
- Family: Geraniaceae
- Genus: Pelargonium
- Species: P. zonale

Binomial name
- Pelargonium zonale (L.) L'Hér. ex Aiton

Synonyms
- Ciconium clarum Hoffmanns.; Ciconium cocciniflorum Hoffmanns.; Ciconium densiflorum Eckl. & Zeyh.; Ciconium leucanthum Hoffmanns.; Ciconium rosula Hoffmanns.; Ciconium stenopetalum Hoffmanns.; Ciconium zonale (L.) Hoffmanns.; Geraniospermum zonale (L.) Kuntze; Geranium marginatum Cav.; Geranium zonale L.

= Pelargonium zonale =

Species of flowering plant

Pelargonium zonale is a species of Pelargonium native to southern Africa in the western regions of the Cape Provinces, in the geranium family. It is one of the parents of the widely cultivated plant Pelargonium × hortorum, often called "geranium", "horseshoe geranium", "zonal geranium" or "zonal pelargonium".

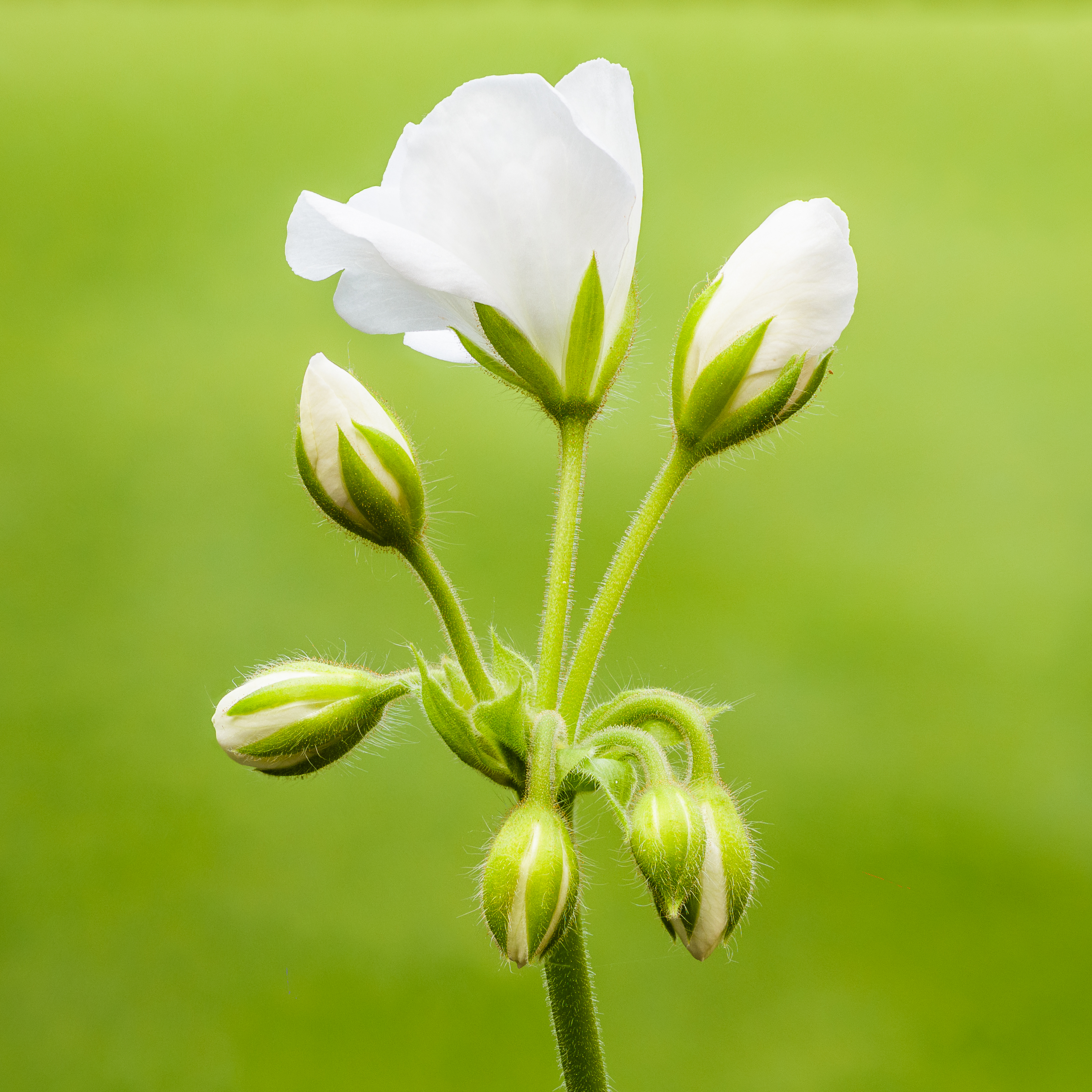
Flower and flower buds of a white Pelargonium zonale.

== Etymology ==
The genus name Pelargonium, in scientific Latin, derives from the Greek pelargós (πελαργός), designating the stork, the shape of the fruit evoking the beak of the bird. The specific epithet zonale is the neutral inflected form of the Latin zonalis "relative to the zone", with reference to the brown zone on the leaf.

Pelargonium zonale was collected by Henrik Bernard Oldenland in 1689 at Meiringspoort Pas. The species was described by the Dutch botanist Jan Commelijn (1629–1692) and illustrated with a watercolor by Maria Moninckx.

== Description ==
Pelargonium zonale is an upright or scrambling shrub, normally growing to about 1 m (3 ft) in height. Its stems are succulent, hairy when young and becoming woody with age. The leaves often have a narrow, dark, zigzag "zone" of pigmentation, giving rise to both the scientific and common names. The flowers are borne in an umbel; individual flowers are markedly zygomorphic. The petals are narrow and a bright, deep pink, with reddish lines along the petals' length. Leaves are reniform and petiolate with an average diameter of 5–8 cm (2–3 in).

== Cultivation ==
In the 16th century, pelargonium seeds were transported from Africa to Leiden in the Netherlands, where the plant was grown in the botanical garden there. Within a few years, it reached the British Isles, France, Italy and Spain and became popular. It gradually reached the islands of the Caribbean, and in the 17th century it was already known in North America. Today it is naturalized in many subtropical and tropical countries and in colder areas must be grown indoors.

Plants can be obtained from seeds or vegetatively. The hard-coated seeds germinate within 14 days at about 20 °C. once the seed coat is compromised. Micropropagation has been used commercially since the 20th century.

In temperate climate zones, plants are set out in gardens in the spring, then can be dug prior to the first freeze and brought indoors to overwinter; they can be re-planted in the spring.

== Hybridization ==
This species, when hybridized with closely related species, has yielded a group of hybrid plants referred to as Pelargonium × hortorum. These hybrids are usually referred to by the common name "zonal geranium".

== Gallery ==
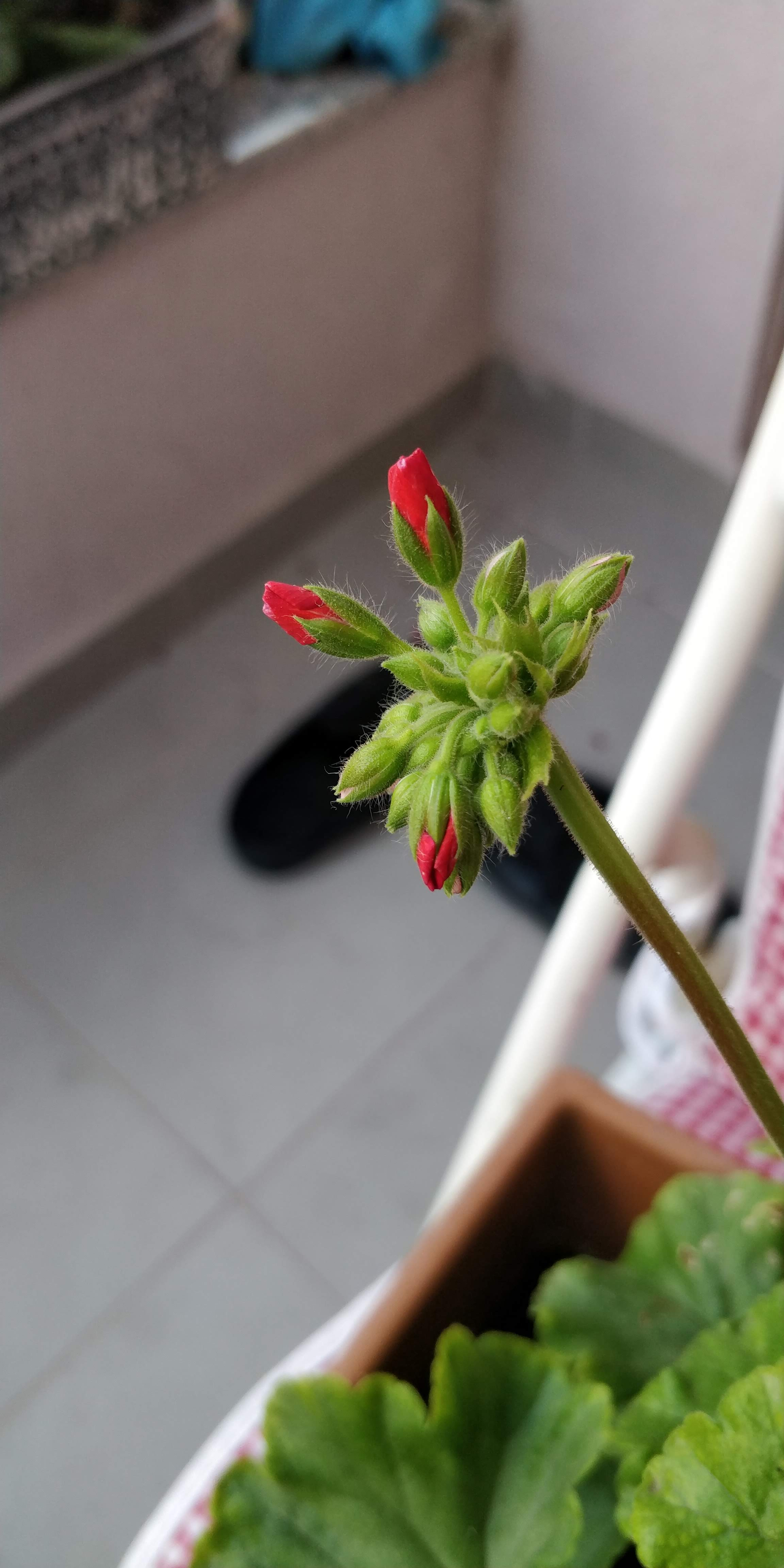
Half opening umbel of a Pelargonium zonale

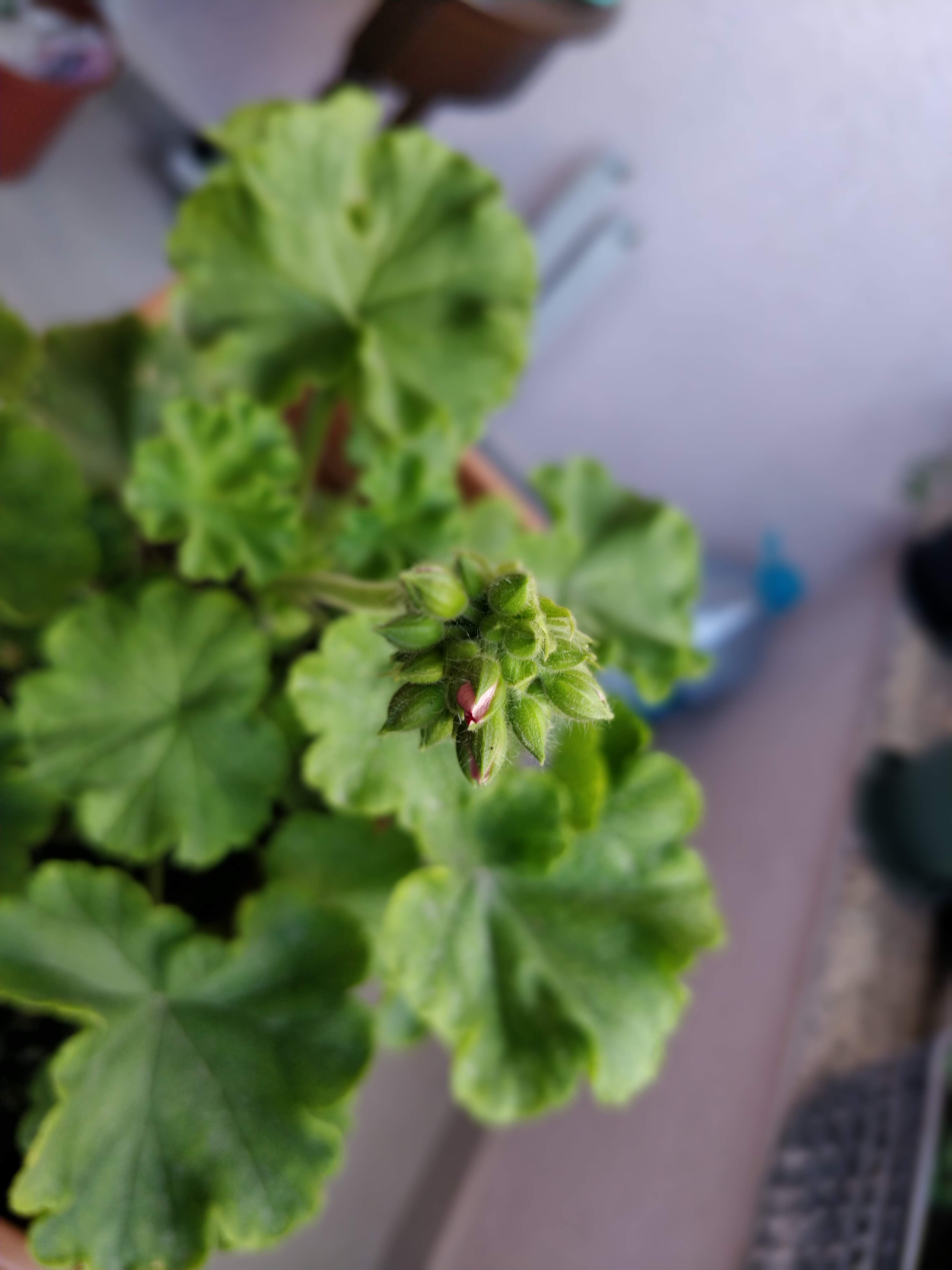
Umbel of a Pelargonium zonale

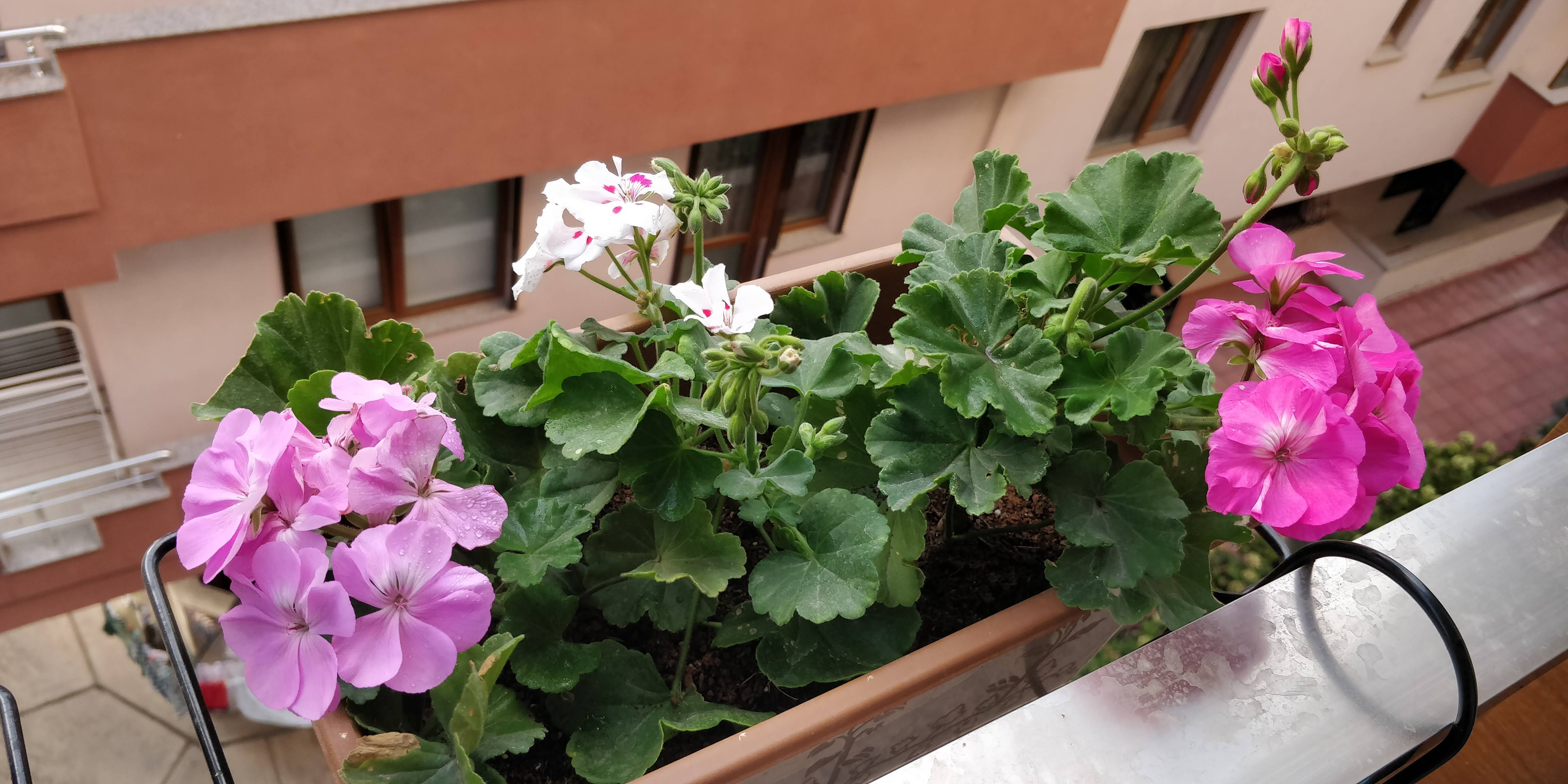
Pelargoniums in various colors
