= List of Pelargonium species =

The Plant List has 250 accepted species names (including two primary hybrids) and 9 subspecies or varieties for the genus Pelargonium as of 2012.

== A ==
- Pelargonium abrotanifolium Jacq.
- Pelargonium acetosum (L.) L'Hér.
- Pelargonium aciculatum E.M.Marais
- Pelargonium acraeum R.A.Dyer
- Pelargonium aestivale E.M.Marais
- Pelargonium afrum (Eckl. & Zeyh.) Steud.
- Pelargonium album J.J.A.van der Walt
- Pelargonium alchemilloides (L.) Aiton
- Pelargonium alpinum Eckl. & Zeyh.
- Pelargonium alternans J.C.Wendl.
- Pelargonium althaeoides (L.) L'Hér.
- Pelargonium anethifolium Harv.
- Pelargonium angustifolium DC.
- Pelargonium antidysentericum (Eckl. & Zeyh.) Kostel.
- Pelargonium apetalum P.Taylor
- Pelargonium appendiculatum (L.f.) Willd.
- Pelargonium aridum R.A.Dyer
- Pelargonium aristatum (Sweet) G.Don
- Pelargonium artemisiifolium DC.
- Pelargonium articulatum Willd.
- Pelargonium asarifolium (Sweet) D.Don
- Pelargonium astragalifolium Jacq.
- Pelargonium attenuatum Harv.
- Pelargonium auritum (L.) Willd.
  - Pelargonium auritum subsp. carneum (Harv.) J.J.A.van der Walt
- Pelargonium australe Willd.

== B ==
- Pelargonium barbatum Jacq.
- Pelargonium barklyi Scott-Elliot
- Pelargonium betulinum (L.) L'Hér. ex Aiton
- Pelargonium bicolor Aiton
- Pelargonium bifolium Willd.
- Pelargonium bijugum Steud.
- Pelargonium boranense Friis & Gilbert
- Pelargonium bowkeri Harv.
- Pelargonium brevipetalum N.E.Br.
- Pelargonium brevirostre E.Mey. ex Knuth
- Pelargonium bubonifolium Pers.
- Pelargonium burtoniae L.Bolus

== C ==
- Pelargonium caespitosum Turcz.
- Pelargonium caledonicum L.Bolus
- Pelargonium calviniae Knuth.
- Pelargonium campestre Harv.
- Pelargonium candicans Spreng.
- Pelargonium capillare Willd.
- Pelargonium capitatum (L.) L'Hér.
- Pelargonium capituliforme R.Knuth
- Pelargonium carneum Jacq.
- Pelargonium carnosum (L.) L'Hér.
- Pelargonium caroli-henrici B.Nord.
- Pelargonium caucalifolium Jacq.
  - Pelargonium caucalifolium subsp. convolvulifolium J.J.A.van der Walt
- Pelargonium cavanillesii R.Knuth
- Pelargonium caylae Humbert
- Pelargonium ceratophyllum L'Hér.
- Pelargonium chamaedryfolium Jacq.
- Pelargonium chelidonium DC.
- Pelargonium citronellum J.J.A.van der Walt
- Pelargonium columbinum Jacq.
- Pelargonium confertum E.M.Marais
- Pelargonium cordifolium Curtis
- Pelargonium coronopifolium Jacq.
- Pelargonium cortusaefolium L'Hér.
- Pelargonium cradockense R.Knuth
- Pelargonium crassicaule L'Hér.
- Pelargonium crassipes Harv.
- Pelargonium crinitum Harv.
- Pelargonium crispum (P.J.Bergius) L'Hér.
- Pelargonium crithmifolium Sm.
- Pelargonium cucullatum (L.) L'Hér.
  - Pelargonium cucullatum subsp. strigifolium Volschenk
- Pelargonium curviandrum E.M.Marais

== D ==
- Pelargonium dasyphyllum E.Mey. ex Knuth
- Pelargonium denticulatum Jacq.
- Pelargonium desertorum Vorster
- Pelargonium dichondrifolium DC.
- Pelargonium dipetalum L'Hér.
- Pelargonium dispar N.E.Br.
- Pelargonium divisifolium Vorster
- Pelargonium dodonaei Hoffmanns.
- Pelargonium dolomiticum R.Knuth

== E ==
- Pelargonium echinatum Curtis
- Pelargonium elegans Willd.
- Pelargonium ellaphieae E.M.Marais
- Pelargonium elongatum Salisb.
- Pelargonium englerianum R.Knuth
- Pelargonium ensatum DC.
- Pelargonium erlangerianum Kunth
- Pelargonium exhibens Vorster
- Pelargonium exstipulatum L'Hér.

== F ==
- Pelargonium fasciculaceum E.M.Marais
- Pelargonium fergusoniae L.Bolus
- Pelargonium fissifolium Pers.
- Pelargonium frutetorum R.A.Dyer
- Pelargonium fruticosum Willd.
- Pelargonium fulgidum L'Hér.
- Pelargonium fumariifolium R.Knuth
- Pelargonium fumarioides L'Hér. ex Harv.

== G ==
- Pelargonium gibbosum (L.) L'Hér. ex Aiton
- Pelargonium gilgianum Schltr. ex Knuth
- Pelargonium glechomoides A.Rich.
- Pelargonium glutinosum (Jacq.) L'Hér.
- Pelargonium gracilipes R.Knuth
- Pelargonium gracillimum Fourc.
- Pelargonium grandicalcaratum R.Knuth
- Pelargonium grandiflorum Willd.
- Pelargonium graveolens L'Hér.
- Pelargonium grenvilleae Harv.
- Pelargonium greytonense J.J.A.van der Walt
- Pelargonium griseum R.Knuth
- Pelargonium grossularioides (L.) L'Hér.

== H ==
- Pelargonium hantamianum R.Knuth
- Pelargonium harveyanum Schltr. ex Knuth
- Pelargonium hemicyclicum Hutch. & C.A.Sm.
- Pelargonium heracleifolium Lodd.
- Pelargonium hermanniifolium Jacq.
- Pelargonium heterophyllum Jacq.
- Pelargonium hirtum Jacq.
- Pelargonium hispidum Willd.
- Pelargonium hypoleucum Turcz.
- Pelargonium hystrix Harv.

== I ==
- Pelargonium incarnatum (L.) Moench
- Pelargonium incrassatum Sims
- Pelargonium inodorum Willd.
- Pelargonium inquinans (L.) L'Hér.
- Pelargonium iocastum Steud.
- Pelargonium ionidiflorum Steud.

== K ==
- Pelargonium karooicum Compton & Barnes
- Pelargonium klinghardtense R.Knuth

== L ==
- Pelargonium laciniatum R.Knuth
- Pelargonium ladysmithianum R.Knuth
- Pelargonium laevigatum Willd.
- Pelargonium lanceolatum J.Kern
- Pelargonium leipoldtii R.Knuth
- Pelargonium leptum L.Bolus
- Pelargonium leucophyllum Turcz.
- Pelargonium lobatum (Burm.f.) L'Hér.
- Pelargonium longicaule Jacq.
- Pelargonium longiflorum Hedw.
- Pelargonium longifolium Jacq.
- Pelargonium luridum (Andrews) Sweet
- Pelargonium luteolum N.E.Br.
- Pelargonium luteum G.Don

== M ==
- Pelargonium madagascariense Baker
- Pelargonium magenteum J.J.A.van der Walt
- Pelargonium malacoides R.Knuth
- Pelargonium marginatum Knuth
- Pelargonium moniliforme Harv.
- Pelargonium mossambicense Engl.
- Pelargonium multibracteatum Hochst. ex A.Rich.
- Pelargonium multicaule Jacq.
  - Pelargonium multicaule subsp. subherbaceum (R.Knuth) J.J.A.van der Walt
- Pelargonium multiradiatum J.C.Wendl.
- Pelargonium myrrhifolium (L.) L'Hér.

== N ==
- Pelargonium namaquense R.Knuth
- Pelargonium nelsonii Burtt Davy
- Pelargonium nephrophyllum E.M.Marais
- Pelargonium nervifolium Jacq.
- Pelargonium nivenii Harv.

== O ==
- Pelargonium oblongatum E.Mey. ex Harv.
- Pelargonium ocellatum J.J.A.van der Walt
- Pelargonium ochloleucum Harv.
- Pelargonium odoratissimum (L.) L'Hér.
- Pelargonium oenothera Jacq.
- Pelargonium oppositifolium Schltr.
- Pelargonium oreophilum Schltr.
- Pelargonium otaviense R.Knuth
- Pelargonium ovale L'Hér.
  - Pelargonium ovale subsp. veronicifolium (Eckl. & Zeyh.) Hugo
  - Pelargonium ovale var. blattarium (Sweet) Harv.
- Pelargonium ovalifolium DC.
- Pelargonium oxalidifolium Harv.
- Pelargonium oxaloides Willd.

== P ==
- Pelargonium panduriforme Eckl. & Zeyh.
- Pelargonium paniculatum Jacq.
- Pelargonium papilionaceum (L.) L'Hér. ex Aiton
- Pelargonium parvipetalum E.M.Marais
- Pelargonium parvirostre R.A.Dyer
- Pelargonium parvulum DC.
- Pelargonium patulum Jacq.
  - Pelargonium patulum var.tennuilobum (Eckl. & Zeyh.) Harv.
- Pelargonium peltatum (L.) L'Hér.
- Pelargonium petroselinifolium G.Don
- Pelargonium pillansii Salter
- Pelargonium pilosum Pers.
- Pelargonium pinnatum (L.) L'Hér.
- Pelargonium plurisectum Salter
- Pelargonium polycephalum E.Mey.
- Pelargonium praemorsum F.Dietr.
- Pelargonium procumbens Pers.
- Pelargonium proliferum Steud.
- Pelargonium pseudofumarioides R.Knuth
- Pelargonium pseudoglutinosum R.Knuth
- Pelargonium pulchellum Sims
- Pelargonium pulcherrimum Leight.
- Pelargonium pulverulentum Colv. ex Sweet
- Pelargonium punctatum Willd.

== Q ==
- Pelargonium quercifolium (L.f.) L'Hér.
- Pelargonium quinquelobatum Hochst. ex Rich.

== R ==
- Pelargonium radens H.E.Moore
- Pelargonium radiatum Pers.
- Pelargonium radicatum Vent.
- Pelargonium radula (Cav.) L'Hér.
- Pelargonium radulifolium Harv.
- Pelargonium ramosissimum Willd.
- Pelargonium ranunculophyllum Baker
- Pelargonium rapaceum (L.) L'Hér.
- Pelargonium reflexum Pers.
- Pelargonium reniforme Curtis
- Pelargonium reticulatum DC.
- Pelargonium revolutum Pers.
- Pelargonium ribifolium Jacq.
- Pelargonium rustii R.Knuth

== S ==
- Pelargonium salmoneum R.A.Dyer
- Pelargonium scabroide R.Knuth
- Pelargonium scabrum (L.) L'Hér.
- Pelargonium schizopetalum Sweet
- Pelargonium semitrilobum Jacq.
- Pelargonium senecioides L'Hér.
- Pelargonium sericifolium J.J.A.van der Walt
- Pelargonium setosiusculum R.Knuth
- Pelargonium setulosum Turcz.
- Pelargonium sibthorpiifolium Harv.
- Pelargonium sidifolium R.Knuth
- Pelargonium sidoides DC.
- Pelargonium spathulatum DC.
- Pelargonium spinosum Willd.
- Pelargonium squamulosum R.Knuth
- Pelargonium stipulaceum Willd.
  - Pelargonium stipulaceum subsp. ovato-stipulatum (Knuth) Vorster
- Pelargonium sublignosum R.Knuth
- Pelargonium suburbanum Clifford ex Boucher
  - Pelargonium suburbanum subsp. bipinnatifidum (Harv.) Boucher
- Pelargonium sulphureum R.Knuth

== T ==
- Pelargonium tabulare L'Hér.
- Pelargonium tenellum G.Don
- Pelargonium tenuicaule R.Knuth
- Pelargonium ternatum Jacq.
- Pelargonium ternifolium Vorster
- Pelargonium tetragonum L'Hér.
- Pelargonium tomentosum Jacq.
- Pelargonium tongaense Vorster
- Pelargonium torulosum E.M.Marais
- Pelargonium transvaalense R.Knuth
- Pelargonium triandrum E.M.Marais
- Pelargonium tricolor Curt.
- Pelargonium trifidum Jacq.
- Pelargonium trifoliolatum E.M.Marais
- Pelargonium triphyllum Jacq.
- Pelargonium triste (L.) L'Hér.
- Pelargonium tysonii Szyszył.

== U ==
- Pelargonium undulatum Pers.

== V ==
- Pelargonium viciifolium DC.
- Pelargonium vinaceum E.M.Marais
- Pelargonium violiflorum DC.
- Pelargonium vitifolium (L.) L'Hér.

== W ==
- Pelargonium whytei Baker
- Pelargonium woodii R.Knuth

== X ==
- Pelargonium xerophyton Schltr. ex Knuth

== Z ==
- Pelargonium zonale (L.) L'Hér. ex Aiton

Primary hybrids

- Pelargonium × domesticum L.H.Bailey (Note: There is some confusion about Pelargonium × domesticum. The Plant List had the name as "Accepted" in Version 1 and "Unresolved" in Version 1.1 with the following description and note: The record derives from Tropicos (data supplied on 2012-04-18) which reports it as an accepted name (record 13900977) with original publication details: Stand. Cycl. Hort. 2532 1916. * The status of this record (as well as of any names linked with it) has been modified as part of procedures used to resolve data conflicts detected in the supplied data sets. Tropicos reports the same status and reference for both Pelargonium domesticum and Pelargonium × domesticum: "Authors: Bailey, Liberty Hyde; Published In: The Standard Cyclopedia of Horticulture 2532. 1916." It has Pelargonium domesticum listed as a species and Pelargonium × domesticum as a nothospecies.)
- Pelargonium × fragrans Willd.
- Pelargonium × hortorum L.H.Bailey

Unresolved names

- Pelargonium australe
- Pelargonium cotyledonis
- Pelargonium drummondii
- Pelargonium insularis
- Pelargonium laxum
- Pelargonium littorale
- Pelargonium rodneyanum
- Pelargonium sp. Striatellum (undescribed)
