= List of Geraniales of South Africa =

Flowering plants in the order Geraniales recorded from South Africa

The Geraniales are a small order of flowering plants, in the rosid subclade of eudicots. The largest family in the order is Geraniaceae with over 800 species. In addition, the order includes the smaller Francoaceae with about 40 species. Most Geraniales are herbaceous, but there are also shrubs and small trees.

Flower morphology of the Geraniales is rather conserved. They are usually perfectly pentamerous and pentacyclic without fused organs besides the carpels of the superior gynoecium. The androecium is obdiplostemonous. Only a few genera are tetramerous (Francoa, Dimorphopetalum, Melianthus). In some genera some stamens (Pelargonium) or a complete whorl of stamens are reduced (Erodium, Melianthus). In the genera Hypseocharis and Monsonia there are 15 instead of the usual ten stamens. Most genera bear nectariferous flowers. The nectary glands are formed by the receptacle and are localised at the bases of the antesepalous stamens.

The anthophytes are a grouping of plant taxa bearing flower-like reproductive structures. They were formerly thought to be a clade comprising plants bearing flower-like structures. The group contained the angiosperms - the extant flowering plants, such as roses and grasses - as well as the Gnetales and the extinct Bennettitales.

23,420 species of vascular plant have been recorded in South Africa, making it the sixth most species-rich country in the world and the most species-rich country on the African continent. Of these, 153 species are considered to be threatened. Nine biomes have been described in South Africa: Fynbos, Succulent Karoo, desert, Nama Karoo, grassland, savanna, Albany thickets, the Indian Ocean coastal belt, and forests.

The 2018 South African National Biodiversity Institute's National Biodiversity Assessment plant checklist lists 35,130 taxa in the phyla Anthocerotophyta (hornworts (6)), Anthophyta (flowering plants (33534)), Bryophyta (mosses (685)), Cycadophyta (cycads (42)), Lycopodiophyta (Lycophytes(45)), Marchantiophyta (liverworts (376)), Pinophyta (conifers (33)), and Pteridophyta (cryptogams (408)).

Two families are represented in the literature. Listed taxa include species, subspecies, varieties, and forms as recorded, some of which have subsequently been allocated to other taxa as synonyms, in which cases the accepted taxon is appended to the listing. Multiple entries under alternative names reflect taxonomic revision over time.

== Geraniaceae ==
Family: Geraniaceae,

=== Erodium ===
Genus Erodium

- Erodium botrys (Cav.) Bertol. not indigenous, naturalised
- Erodium brachycarpum (Godr.) Thell. not indigenous, naturalised
- Erodium chium (L.) Willd. not indigenous, naturalised
- Erodium cicutarium (L.) L'Her. not indigenous, naturalised
- Erodium malacoides (L.) L'Her. subsp. malacoides, not indigenous, naturalised
- Erodium moschatum (L.) L'Her. not indigenous, naturalised, invasive

=== Geraniospermum ===
Genus Geraniospermum

- Geraniospermum carnosum (L.) Kuntze, accepted as Pelargonium carnosum (L.) L'Her. subsp. carnosum, indigenous
- Geraniospermum dipetalum (L'Her.) Kuntze, accepted as Pelargonium dipetalum L'Her. subsp. dipetalum
- Geraniospermum ferulaceum (Cav.) Kuntze, accepted as Pelargonium carnosum (L.) L'Her. subsp. ferulaceum (Cav.) M.Becker & F.Albers, indigenous
- Geraniospermum nivenii (Harv.) Kuntze, accepted as Pelargonium dipetalum L'Her. subsp. dipetalum

=== Geranium ===
Genus Geranium

- Geranium amatolicum Hilliard & B.L.Burtt, endemic
- Geranium angustipetalum Hilliard & B.L.Burtt, endemic
- Geranium arabicum Forssk. indigenous
  - Geranium arabicum Forssk. subsp. arabicum, endemic
- Geranium baurianum R.Knuth, endemic
- Geranium brycei N.E.Br. indigenous
- Geranium caffrum Eckl. & Zeyh. endemic
- Geranium canescens L'Her. endemic
- Geranium carnosum L. accepted as Pelargonium carnosum (L.) L'Her. subsp. carnosum, indigenous
- Geranium contortum Eckl. & Zeyh. endemic
- Geranium dipetalum (L'Her.) Poir. accepted as Pelargonium dipetalum L'Her. subsp. dipetalum
- Geranium discolor Hilliard & B.L.Burtt, endemic
- Geranium dissectum L. not indigenous, naturalised, invasive
- Geranium drakensbergensis Hilliard & B.L.Burtt, indigenous
- Geranium dregei Hilliard & B.L.Burtt, endemic
- Geranium ferulaceum Cav. accepted as Pelargonium carnosum (L.) L'Her. subsp. ferulaceum (Cav.) M.Becker & F.Albers, indigenous
- Geranium flanaganii R.Knuth, indigenous
- Geranium grandistipulatum Hilliard & B.L.Burtt, endemic
- Geranium harveyi Briq. endemic
- Geranium incanum Burm.f. indigenous
  - Geranium incanum Burm.f. var. incanum, endemic
  - Geranium incanum Burm.f. var. multifidum (Sweet) Hilliard & B.L.Burtt, endemic
- Geranium magniflorum R.Knuth, indigenous
- Geranium molle L. not indigenous, naturalised, invasive
- Geranium multisectum N.E.Br. indigenous
- Geranium natalense Hilliard & B.L.Burtt, endemic
- Geranium nyassense R.Knuth, indigenous
- Geranium ornithopodioides Hilliard & B.L.Burtt, endemic
- Geranium ornithopodum Eckl. & Zeyh. endemic
- Geranium pulchrum N.E.Br. endemic
- Geranium purpureum Vill. not indigenous, naturalised, invasive
- Geranium robustum Kuntze, indigenous
- Geranium rotundifolium L. not indigenous, naturalised
- Geranium schlechteri R.Knuth, indigenous
- Geranium sparsiflorum R.Knuth, endemic
- Geranium subglabrum Hilliard & B.L.Burtt, endemic
- Geranium wakkerstroomianum R.Knuth, indigenous

=== Hoarea ===
Genus Hoarea

- Hoarea erythrophylla Eckl. & Zeyh. accepted as Pelargonium dipetalum L'Her. subsp. dipetalum

=== Monsonia ===
Genus Monsonia

- Monsonia angustifolia E.Mey. ex A.Rich. indigenous
- Monsonia attenuata Harv. indigenous
- Monsonia brevirostrata R.Knuth, indigenous
- Monsonia burkeana Planch. ex Harv. indigenous
- Monsonia camdeboensis (Moffett) F.Albers, endemic
- Monsonia ciliata (Moffett) F.Albers, endemic
- Monsonia crassicaulis (Rehm) F.Albers, indigenous
- Monsonia emarginata (L.f.) L'Her. endemic
- Monsonia flavescens (Rehm) F.Albers, indigenous
- Monsonia galpinii Schltr. ex R.Knuth, endemic
- Monsonia glauca R.Knuth, indigenous
- Monsonia grandifolia R.Knuth, endemic
- Monsonia herrei (L.Bolus) F.Albers, endemic
- Monsonia lanuginosa R.Knuth, endemic
- Monsonia luederitziana Focke & Schinz, indigenous
- Monsonia multifida E.Mey. indigenous
- Monsonia natalensis R.Knuth, endemic
- Monsonia parvifolia Schinz, indigenous
- Monsonia patersonii DC. indigenous
- Monsonia praemorsa E.Mey. ex R.Knuth, endemic
- Monsonia salmoniflora (Moffett) F.Albers, indigenous
- Monsonia senegalensis Guill. & Perr. indigenous
- Monsonia speciosa L. endemic
- Monsonia spinosa L'Her. endemic
- Monsonia transvaalensis R.Knuth, endemic
- Monsonia umbellata Harv. indigenous
- Monsonia vanderietiae (L.Bolus) F.Albers, endemic

=== Pelargonium ===
Genus Pelargonium

- Pelargonium abrotanifolium (L.f.) Jacq. endemic
- Pelargonium acetosum (L.) L'Her. endemic
- Pelargonium aciculatum E.M.Marais, endemic
- Pelargonium acraeum R.A.Dyer, indigenous
- Pelargonium adriaanii M.Becker & F.Albers, endemic
- Pelargonium aestivale E.M.Marais, endemic
- Pelargonium albersii M.Becker, indigenous
- Pelargonium album J.J.A.van der Walt, endemic
- Pelargonium alchemilloides (L.) L'Her. indigenous
- Pelargonium alpinum Eckl. & Zeyh. endemic
- Pelargonium alternans J.C.Wendl. indigenous
  - Pelargonium alternans J.C.Wendl. subsp. alternans, endemic
  - Pelargonium alternans J.C.Wendl. subsp. longicalcar M.Becker & F.Albers, endemic
  - Pelargonium alternans J.C.Wendl. subsp. parviinflorescens M.Becker & F.Albers, endemic
- Pelargonium althaeoides (L.) L'Her. indigenous
- Pelargonium anethifolium (Eckl. & Zeyh.) Steud. endemic
- Pelargonium angustifolium (Thunb.) DC. accepted as Pelargonium longiflorum Jacq. present
- Pelargonium angustipetalum E.M.Marais, endemic
- Pelargonium antidysentericum (Eckl. & Zeyh.) Kostel. indigenous
  - Pelargonium antidysentericum (Eckl. & Zeyh.) Kostel. subsp. antidysentericum, indigenous
  - Pelargonium antidysentericum (Eckl. & Zeyh.) Kostel. subsp. inerme Scheltema, endemic
  - Pelargonium antidysentericum (Eckl. & Zeyh.) Kostel. subsp. zonale Scheltema, endemic
- Pelargonium appendiculatum (L.f.) Willd. endemic
- Pelargonium aridicola E.M.Marais, endemic
- Pelargonium aridum R.A.Dyer, indigenous
- Pelargonium aristatum (Sweet) G.Don, endemic
- Pelargonium articulatum (Cav.) Willd. indigenous
- Pelargonium asarifolium (Sweet) Loudon, endemic
- Pelargonium astragalifolium (Cav.) Jacq. accepted as Pelargonium pinnatum (L.) L'Her. present
- Pelargonium attenuatum Harv. endemic
- Pelargonium auritum (L.) Willd. indigenous
  - Pelargonium auritum (L.) Willd. subsp. auritum, accepted as Pelargonium auritum (L.) Willd. var. auritum, indigenous
  - Pelargonium auritum (L.) Willd. subsp. carneum (Harv.) J.J.A.van der Walt, accepted as Pelargonium auritum (L.) Willd. var. carneum (Harv.) E.M.Marais, indigenous
  - Pelargonium auritum (L.) Willd. var. auritum, indigenous
  - Pelargonium auritum (L.) Willd. var. carneum (Harv.) E.M.Marais, indigenous
- Pelargonium barklyi Scott-Elliot, endemic
- Pelargonium bechuanicum Burtt Davy var. latisectum Burtt Davy, accepted as Pelargonium dolomiticum R.Knuth, indigenous
- Pelargonium betulinum (L.) L'Her. endemic
- Pelargonium bicolor (Jacq.) L'Her. endemic
- Pelargonium bifolium (Burm.f.) Willd. endemic
- Pelargonium bowkeri Harv. indigenous
- Pelargonium brevipetalum N.E.Br. endemic
- Pelargonium brevirostre R.A.Dyer, endemic
- Pelargonium bubonifolium (Andrews) Pers. indigenous
- Pelargonium burgerianum J.J.A.van der Walt, endemic
- Pelargonium burtoniae L.Bolus, endemic
- Pelargonium buysii Hellbr. endemic
- Pelargonium caespitosum Turcz. indigenous
  - Pelargonium caespitosum Turcz. subsp. caespitosum, endemic
  - Pelargonium caespitosum Turcz. subsp. concavum Hugo, endemic
- Pelargonium caffrum (Eckl. & Zeyh.) Harv. endemic
- Pelargonium caledonicum L.Bolus, endemic
- Pelargonium calviniae R.Knuth, endemic
- Pelargonium campestre (Eckl. & Zeyh.) Steud. endemic
- Pelargonium candicans Spreng. endemic
- Pelargonium capillare (Cav.) Willd. endemic
- Pelargonium capitatum (L.) L'Her. indigenous
- Pelargonium capituliforme R.Knuth, indigenous
- Pelargonium carneum Jacq. endemic
- Pelargonium carnosum (L.) L'Her. indigenous
  - Pelargonium carnosum (L.) L'Her. subsp. carnosum, indigenous
  - Pelargonium carnosum (L.) L'Her. subsp. ferulaceum (Cav.) M.Becker & F.Albers, indigenous
- Pelargonium caroli-henrici B.Nord. endemic
- Pelargonium caucalifolium Jacq. indigenous
  - Pelargonium caucalifolium Jacq. subsp. caucalifolium, endemic
  - Pelargonium caucalifolium Jacq. subsp. convolvulifolium (Schltr. ex R.Knuth) J.J.A.van der Walt, endemic
- Pelargonium cavanillesii Knuth, accepted as Pelargonium heterophyllum Jacq. present
- Pelargonium ceratophyllum L'Her. indigenous
- Pelargonium chamaedryfolium Jacq. endemic
- Pelargonium chelidonium (Houtt.) DC. endemic
- Pelargonium citronellum J.J.A.van der Walt, endemic
- Pelargonium columbinum Jacq. endemic
- Pelargonium confertum E.M.Marais, endemic
- Pelargonium connivens E.M.Marais, endemic
- Pelargonium conradieae J.C.Manning & A.Le Roux, endemic
- Pelargonium cordifolium (Cav.) Curtis, endemic
- Pelargonium coronopifolium Jacq. endemic
- Pelargonium crassicaule L'Her. indigenous
- Pelargonium crassipes Harv. endemic
- Pelargonium crinitum Harv. accepted as Pelargonium radiatum (Andrews) Pers. present
- Pelargonium crispum (P.J.Bergius) L'Her. endemic
- Pelargonium crithmifolium Sm. indigenous
- Pelargonium cucullatum (L.) L'Her. indigenous
  - Pelargonium cucullatum (L.) L'Her. subsp. cucullatum, endemic
  - Pelargonium cucullatum (L.) L'Her. subsp. strigifolium Volschenk, endemic
  - Pelargonium cucullatum (L.) L'Her. subsp. tabulare Volschenk, endemic
- Pelargonium curviandrum E.M.Marais, endemic
- Pelargonium dasyphyllum E.Mey. ex R.Knuth, endemic
- Pelargonium denticulatum Jacq. endemic
- Pelargonium desertorum Vorster, endemic
- Pelargonium dichondrifolium DC. endemic
- Pelargonium dipetalum L'Her. indigenous
  - Pelargonium dipetalum L'Her. subsp. dipetalum, endemic
  - Pelargonium dipetalum L'Her. subsp. stenosiphon J.C.Manning & M.M.le Roux, endemic
- Pelargonium dispar N.E.Br. endemic
- Pelargonium divisifolium Vorster, endemic
- Pelargonium dolomiticum R.Knuth, indigenous
- Pelargonium echinatum Curtis, endemic
- Pelargonium elandsmontanum E.M.Marais ex J.C.Manning & Goldblatt, indigenous
- Pelargonium elegans (Andrews) Willd. endemic
- Pelargonium ellaphieae E.M.Marais, endemic
- Pelargonium elongatum (Cav.) Salisb. endemic
- Pelargonium englerianum R.Knuth, endemic
- Pelargonium ensatum (Thunb.) DC. accepted as Pelargonium auritum (L.) Willd. var. carneum (Harv.) E.M.Marais, present
- Pelargonium eupatoriifolium (Eckl. & Zeyh.) Steud. endemic
- Pelargonium exhibens Vorster, endemic
- Pelargonium exstipulatum (Cav.) L'Her. endemic
- Pelargonium fasciculaceum E.M.Marais, endemic
- Pelargonium fergusoniae L.Bolus, endemic
- Pelargonium fissifolium (Andrews) Pers. endemic
- Pelargonium flavidum E.M.Marais, endemic
- Pelargonium frutetorum R.A.Dyer, endemic
- Pelargonium fruticosum (Cav.) Willd. endemic
- Pelargonium fulgidum (L.) L'Her. endemic
- Pelargonium fumariifolium R.Knuth, indigenous
- Pelargonium gibbosum (L.) L'Her. endemic
- Pelargonium gilgianum Schltr. ex R.Knuth, endemic
- Pelargonium githagineum E.M.Marais, endemic
- Pelargonium glabriphyllum E.M.Marais, endemic
- Pelargonium glutinosum (Jacq.) L'Her. endemic
- Pelargonium gracile (Eckl. & Zeyh.) Steud. endemic
- Pelargonium gracilipes R.Knuth, endemic
- Pelargonium gracillimum Fourc. endemic
- Pelargonium grandicalcaratum R.Knuth, indigenous
- Pelargonium grandiflorum (Andrews) Willd. endemic
- Pelargonium graveolens L'Her. indigenous
- Pelargonium grenvilleae (Andrews) Harv. endemic
- Pelargonium greytonense J.J.A.van der Walt, endemic
- Pelargonium griseum R.Knuth, endemic
- Pelargonium grossularioides (L.) L'Her. indigenous
- Pelargonium hantamianum R.Knuth, endemic
- Pelargonium hemicyclicum Hutch. & C.A.Sm. endemic
- Pelargonium hermanniifolium (P.J.Bergius) Jacq. endemic
- Pelargonium heterophyllum Jacq. endemic
- Pelargonium hirtipetalum E.M.Marais, endemic
- Pelargonium hirtum (Burm.f.) Jacq. endemic
- Pelargonium hispidum (L.f.) Willd. endemic
- Pelargonium hypoleucum Turcz. endemic
- Pelargonium hystrix Harv. endemic
- Pelargonium incarnatum (L'Her.) Moench, endemic
- Pelargonium incrassatum (Andrews) Sims, indigenous
- Pelargonium inquinans (L.) L'Her. endemic
- Pelargonium iocastum (Eckl. & Zeyh.) Steud. endemic
- Pelargonium ionidiflorum (Eckl. & Zeyh.) Steud. endemic
- Pelargonium karooicum Compton & P.E.Barnes, endemic
- Pelargonium keerombergense M.Becker & F.Albers, endemic
- Pelargonium klinghardtense R.Knuth, indigenous
- Pelargonium laciniatum R.Knuth, endemic
- Pelargonium ladysmithianum R.Knuth, endemic
- Pelargonium laevigatum (L.f.) Willd. indigenous
  - Pelargonium laevigatum (L.f.) Willd. subsp. diversifolium (J.C.Wendl.) Schonken, endemic
  - Pelargonium laevigatum (L.f.) Willd. subsp. laevigatum, endemic
  - Pelargonium laevigatum (L.f.) Willd. subsp. oxyphyllum (DC.) Schonken, endemic
- Pelargonium lanceolatum (Cav.) J.Kern, endemic
- Pelargonium laxum (Sweet) G.Don, indigenous
  - Pelargonium laxum (Sweet) G.Don subsp. karooicum M.Becker & F.Albers, endemic
  - Pelargonium laxum (Sweet) G.Don subsp. laxum, endemic
- Pelargonium leipoldtii R.Knuth, endemic
- Pelargonium leptum L.Bolus, endemic
- Pelargonium leucophyllum Turcz. endemic
- Pelargonium lobatum (Burm.f.) L'Her. endemic
- Pelargonium longicaule Jacq. indigenous
  - Pelargonium longicaule Jacq. var. angustipetalum C.Boucher, endemic
  - Pelargonium longicaule Jacq. var. longicaule, endemic
- Pelargonium longiflorum Jacq. endemic
- Pelargonium longifolium (Burm.f.) Jacq. endemic
- Pelargonium luridum (Andrews) Sweet, indigenous
- Pelargonium luteolum N.E.Br. endemic
- Pelargonium luteum (Andrews) G.Don, endemic
- Pelargonium magenteum J.J.A.van der Walt, endemic
- Pelargonium minimum (Cav.) Willd. indigenous
- Pelargonium mollicomum Fourc. endemic
- Pelargonium moniliforme Harv. endemic
- Pelargonium multicaule Jacq. indigenous
  - Pelargonium multicaule Jacq. subsp. multicaule, indigenous
  - Pelargonium multicaule Jacq. subsp. subherbaceum (R.Knuth) J.J.A.van der Walt, endemic
- Pelargonium multiradiatum J.C.Wendl. endemic
- Pelargonium mutans Vorster, endemic
- Pelargonium myrrhifolium (L.) L'Her. indigenous
  - Pelargonium myrrhifolium (L.) L'Her. var. coriandrifolium (L.) Harv. endemic
  - Pelargonium myrrhifolium (L.) L'Her. var. myrrhifolium, endemic
- Pelargonium namaquense R.Knuth, accepted as Pelargonium bubonifolium (Andrews) Pers. present
- Pelargonium nanum L'Her. indigenous
- Pelargonium nelsonii Burtt Davy, endemic
- Pelargonium nephrophyllum E.M.Marais, endemic
- Pelargonium nervifolium Jacq. endemic
- Pelargonium nivenii Harv. accepted as Pelargonium dipetalum L'Her. subsp. dipetalum, present
- Pelargonium nummulifolium Salisb. endemic
- Pelargonium oblongatum Harv. endemic
- Pelargonium ocellatum J.J.A.van der Walt, endemic
- Pelargonium ochroleucum Harv. endemic
- Pelargonium odoratissimum (L.) L'Her. indigenous
- Pelargonium oenothera (L.f.) Jacq. endemic
- Pelargonium oreophilum Schltr. endemic
- Pelargonium otaviense R.Knuth, indigenous
- Pelargonium ovale (Burm.f.) L'Her. indigenous
  - Pelargonium ovale (Burm.f.) L'Her. subsp. hyalinum Hugo, endemic
  - Pelargonium ovale (Burm.f.) L'Her. subsp. ovale, endemic
  - Pelargonium ovale (Burm.f.) L'Her. subsp. veronicifolium (Eckl. & Zeyh.) Hugo, endemic
- Pelargonium oxaloides (Burm.f.) Willd. endemic
- Pelargonium pachypodium J.P.Roux, endemic
- Pelargonium pallidoflavum E.M.Marais, endemic
- Pelargonium panduriforme Eckl. & Zeyh. endemic
- Pelargonium paniculatum Jacq. indigenous
- Pelargonium papilionaceum (L.) L'Her. endemic
- Pelargonium parvipetalum E.M.Marais, endemic
- Pelargonium parvirostre R.A.Dyer, endemic
- Pelargonium patulum Jacq. endemic
  - Pelargonium patulum Jacq. var. grandiflorum N.van Wyk, endemic
  - Pelargonium patulum Jacq. var. patulum, endemic
  - Pelargonium patulum Jacq. var. tenuilobum (Eckl. & Zeyh.) Harv. endemic
- Pelargonium peltatum (L.) L'Her. endemic
- Pelargonium petroselinifolium G.Don, endemic
- Pelargonium pillansii Salter, endemic
- Pelargonium pilosellifolium (Eckl. & Zeyh.) Steud. endemic
- Pelargonium pilosum (Andrews) Pers. accepted as Pelargonium petroselinifolium G.Don, present
- Pelargonium pinnatum (L.) L'Her. endemic
- Pelargonium plurisectum Salter, endemic
- Pelargonium polycephalum (E.Mey. ex Harv.) R.Knuth, indigenous
- Pelargonium praemorsum (Andrews) F.Dietr. indigenous
  - Pelargonium praemorsum (Andrews) F.Dietr. subsp. praemorsum, endemic
  - Pelargonium praemorsum (Andrews) F.Dietr. subsp. speciosum Scheltema, indigenous
- Pelargonium proliferum (Burm.f.) Steud. endemic
- Pelargonium pseudofumarioides R.Knuth, indigenous
- Pelargonium pseudoglutinosum R.Knuth, endemic
- Pelargonium pubipetalum E.M.Marais, endemic
- Pelargonium pulchellum Sims, endemic
- Pelargonium pulcherrimum F.M.Leight. accepted as Pelargonium radiatum (Andrews) Pers. present
- Pelargonium pulverulentum Colvill ex Sweet, endemic
- Pelargonium punctatum (Andrews) Willd. endemic
- Pelargonium quarciticola Meve & E.M.Marais, endemic
- Pelargonium quercifolium (L.f.) L'Her. endemic
- Pelargonium radens H.E.Moore, endemic
- Pelargonium radiatum (Andrews) Pers. endemic
- Pelargonium radicatum Vent. endemic
- Pelargonium radulifolium (Eckl. & Zeyh.) Steud. endemic
- Pelargonium ramosissimum (Cav.) Willd. endemic
- Pelargonium ranunculophyllum (Eckl. & Zeyh.) Baker, indigenous
- Pelargonium rapaceum (L.) L'Her. endemic
- Pelargonium redactum Vorster, indigenous
- Pelargonium reflexipetalum E.M.Marais, endemic
- Pelargonium reflexum (Andrews) Pers. endemic
- Pelargonium rehmannii Szyszyl. accepted as Pelargonium luridum (Andrews) Sweet, present
- Pelargonium reniforme Curtis, indigenous
  - Pelargonium reniforme Curtis subsp. reniforme, endemic
  - Pelargonium reniforme Curtis subsp. velutinum (Eckl. & Zeyh.) Dreyer, endemic
- Pelargonium reticulatum (Sweet) DC. accepted as Pelargonium auritum (L.) Willd. var. carneum (Harv.) E.M.Marais, present
- Pelargonium revolutum (Andrews) Pers. accepted as Pelargonium chelidonium (Houtt.) DC. present
- Pelargonium ribifolium Jacq. endemic
- Pelargonium riversdalense Knuth, endemic
- Pelargonium rubiginosum E.M.Marais, endemic
- Pelargonium rustii R.Knuth, endemic
- Pelargonium sabulosum E.M.Marais, endemic
- Pelargonium salmoneum R.A.Dyer, endemic
- Pelargonium saxatile J.C.Manning & Goldblatt, endemic
- Pelargonium scabroide R.Knuth, endemic
- Pelargonium scabrum (Burm.f.) L'Her. endemic
- Pelargonium schizopetalum Sweet, endemic
- Pelargonium schlechteri R.Knuth, indigenous
- Pelargonium semitrilobum Jacq. endemic
- Pelargonium senecioides L'Her. endemic
- Pelargonium sericifolium J.J.A.van der Walt, endemic
- Pelargonium setosiusculum R.Knuth, endemic
- Pelargonium setosum (Sweet) DC. endemic
- Pelargonium setulosum Turcz. endemic
- Pelargonium sibthorpiifolium Harv. indigenous
- Pelargonium sidoides DC. indigenous
- Pelargonium spathulatum (Andrews) Pers. accepted as Pelargonium longiflorum Jacq. present
- Pelargonium spinosum Willd. indigenous
- Pelargonium squamulosum R.Knuth, accepted as Pelargonium radicatum Vent. present
- Pelargonium stipulaceum (L.f.) Willd. indigenous
  - Pelargonium stipulaceum (L.f.) Willd. subsp. ovato-stipulatum (R.Knuth) Vorster, endemic
  - Pelargonium stipulaceum (L.f.) Willd. subsp. stipulaceum, endemic
- Pelargonium sublignosum R.Knuth, endemic
- Pelargonium suburbanum Clifford ex C.Boucher, indigenous
  - Pelargonium suburbanum Clifford ex D.A.Boucher subsp. bipinnatifidum Clifford ex D.A.Boucher, endemic
  - Pelargonium suburbanum Clifford ex D.A.Boucher subsp. suburbanum, endemic
- Pelargonium sulphureum R.Knuth, accepted as Pelargonium flavidum E.M.Marais, present
- Pelargonium tabulare (Burm.f.) L'Her. endemic
- Pelargonium tenellum (Andrews) G.Don, endemic
- Pelargonium tenuicaule R.Knuth, indigenous
- Pelargonium ternatum (L.f.) Jacq. endemic
- Pelargonium ternifolium Vorster, endemic
- Pelargonium tetragonum (L.f.) L'Her. endemic
- Pelargonium theianthum (Eckl. & Zeyh.) Steud. endemic
- Pelargonium tomentosum Jacq. endemic
- Pelargonium tongaense Vorster, endemic
- Pelargonium torulosum E.M.Marais, endemic
- Pelargonium tragacanthoides Burch. indigenous
- Pelargonium transvaalense R.Knuth, endemic
- Pelargonium triandrum E.M.Marais, endemic
- Pelargonium tricolor Curtis, endemic
- Pelargonium trifidum Jacq. endemic
- Pelargonium trifoliatum Harv. accepted as Pelargonium ternifolium Vorster, present
- Pelargonium trifoliolatum (Eckl. & Zeyh.) E.M.Marais, endemic
- Pelargonium tripalmatum E.M.Marais, endemic
- Pelargonium triphyllum Jacq. endemic
- Pelargonium triste (L.) L'Her. endemic
- Pelargonium tysonii Szyszyl. accepted as Pelargonium proliferum (Burm.f.) Steud. present
- Pelargonium uliginosum J.C.Manning & Euston-Brown, indigenous
- Pelargonium undulatum (Andrews) Pers. endemic
- Pelargonium viciifolium DC. endemic
- Pelargonium vinaceum E.M.Marais, indigenous
- Pelargonium violiflorum (Sweet) DC. endemic
- Pelargonium vitifolium (L.) L'Her. endemic
- Pelargonium weberi E.M.Marais, endemic
- Pelargonium woodii R.Knuth, endemic
- Pelargonium worcesterae R.Knuth, endemic
- Pelargonium xerophyton Schltr. ex R.Knuth, indigenous
- Pelargonium zeyheri Harv. accepted as Pelargonium luridum (Andrews) Sweet, present
- Pelargonium zonale (L.) L'Her. endemic

=== Sarcocaulon ===
Genus Sarcocaulon

- Sarcocaulon camdeboense Moffett, accepted as Monsonia camdeboensis (Moffett) F.Albers, endemic
- Sarcocaulon ciliatum Moffett, accepted as Monsonia ciliata (Moffett) F.Albers, indigenous
- Sarcocaulon crassicaule Rehm, accepted as Monsonia crassicaulis (Rehm) F.Albers, indigenous
- Sarcocaulon flavescens Rehm, accepted as Monsonia flavescens (Rehm) F.Albers, indigenous
- Sarcocaulon herrei L.Bolus, accepted as Monsonia herrei (L.Bolus) F.Albers, endemic
- Sarcocaulon inerme Rehm, accepted as Monsonia inermis (Rehm) F.Albers
- Sarcocaulon l'heritieri Sweet, accepted as Monsonia spinosa L'Her. indigenous
- Sarcocaulon marlothii Engl. accepted as Monsonia marlothii (Engl.) F.Albers
- Sarcocaulon mossamedense (Welw. ex Oliv.) Hiern, accepted as Monsonia mossamedensis Welw. ex Oliv.
- Sarcocaulon multifidum E.Mey. ex R.Knuth, accepted as Monsonia multifida E.Mey. indigenous
- Sarcocaulon patersonii (DC.) G.Don, accepted as Monsonia patersonii DC. indigenous
- Sarcocaulon peniculinum Moffett, accepted as Monsonia peniculina (Moffett) F.Albers
- Sarcocaulon salmoniflorum Moffett, accepted as Monsonia salmoniflora (Moffett) F.Albers, indigenous
- Sarcocaulon vanderietiae L.Bolus, accepted as Monsonia vanderietiae (L.Bolus) F.Albers, endemic

=== Seymouria ===
Genus Seymouria

- Seymouria l'heritieri Sweet, accepted as Pelargonium dipetalum L'Her. subsp. dipetalum

== Melianthaceae ==
Family: Melianthaceae,

=== Bersama ===
Genus Bersama

- Bersama lucens (Hochst.) Szyszyl. indigenous
- Bersama stayneri E.Phillips, accepted as Bersama tysoniana Oliv. present
- Bersama swinnyi E.Phillips, endemic
- Bersama transvaalensis Turrill, accepted as Bersama tysoniana Oliv. present
- Bersama tysoniana Oliv. indigenous

=== Greyia ===
Genus Greyia

- Greyia flanaganii Bolus, endemic
- Greyia radlkoferi Szyszyl. indigenous
- Greyia sutherlandii Hook. & Harv. indigenous

=== Melianthus ===
Genus Melianthus

- Melianthus comosus Vahl, indigenous
- Melianthus dregeanus Sond. indigenous
  - Melianthus dregeanus Sond. subsp. dregeanus, endemic
  - Melianthus dregeanus Sond. subsp. insignis (Kuntze) S.A.Tansley, endemic
- Melianthus elongatus Wijnands, endemic
- Melianthus major L. endemic
- Melianthus minor L. accepted as Melianthus elongatus Wijnands, present
- Melianthus pectinatus Harv. indigenous
  - Melianthus pectinatus Harv. subsp. gariepinus (Merxm. & Roessler) S.A.Tansley, indigenous
  - Melianthus pectinatus Harv. subsp. pectinatus, indigenous
- Melianthus villosus Bolus, indigenous
