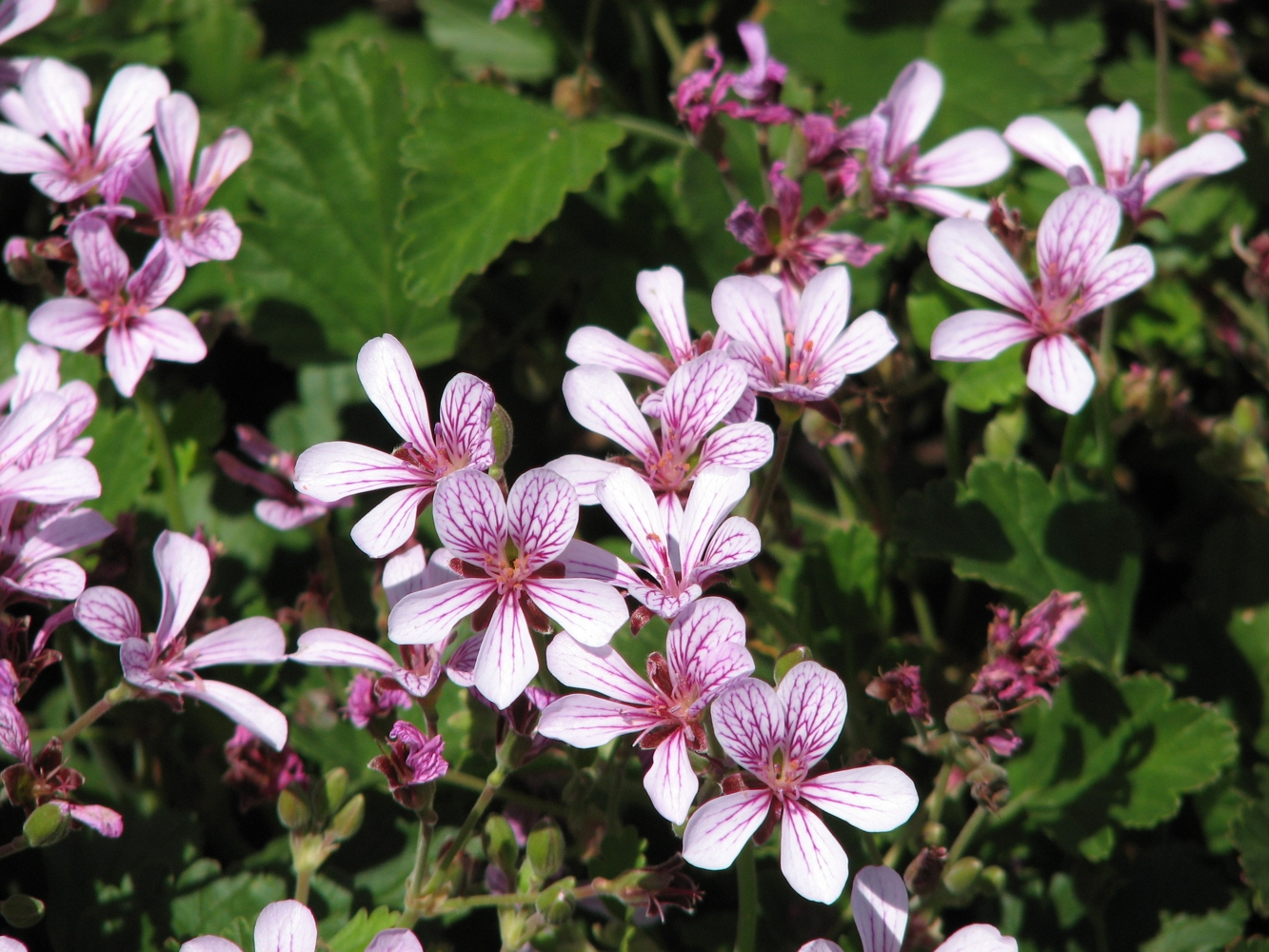

Conservation status
- Endangered (EPBC Act)

Scientific classification
- Kingdom: Plantae
- Clade: Tracheophytes
- Clade: Angiosperms
- Clade: Eudicots
- Clade: Rosids
- Order: Geraniales
- Family: Geraniaceae
- Genus: Pelargonium
- Species: P. sp. Striatellum

Binomial name
- Pelargonium sp. Striatellum

Synonyms
- Pelargonium aff. rodneyanum (Lake Omeo); Pelargonium benambra ms; Pelargonium sp. 1; Pelargonium sp. (G. W. Carr 10345); Pelargonium striatellum ms

= Pelargonium sp. Striatellum =

Species of flowering plant

Pelargonium sp. Striatellum, commonly known as Omeo stork's-bill, is an undescribed species of Pelargonium that is endemic to Australia. It is listed as "endangered" under the Environment Protection and Biodiversity Conservation Act, "endangered" in New South Wales and "vulnerable" in Victoria. It exists in five known locations; four in New South Wales and another in Victoria. Other populations may exist undiscovered on private land.
