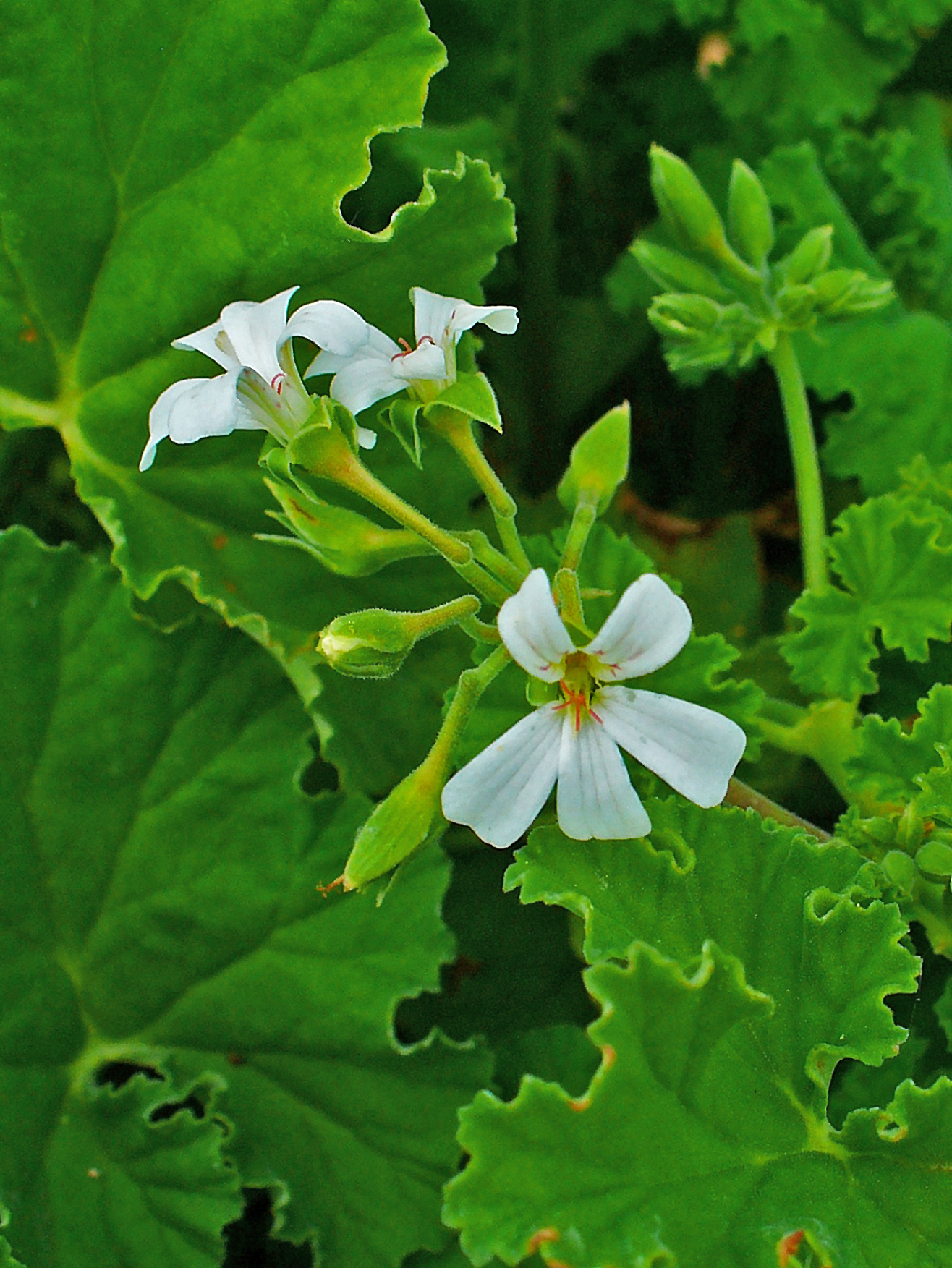

Scientific classification
- Kingdom: Plantae
- Clade: Tracheophytes
- Clade: Angiosperms
- Clade: Eudicots
- Clade: Rosids
- Order: Geraniales
- Family: Geraniaceae
- Genus: Pelargonium
- Species: P. album

Binomial name
- Pelargonium album J.J.A. Van der Walt

= Pelargonium album =

Species of flowering plant

Pelargonium album is a species of flowering plant of the genus Pelargonium. This species is native to South Africa. It is an apple/mint scented pelargonium which is very closely related to Pelargonium odoratissimum. It is in the subgenus reniforme along with Pelargonium sidoides and P. exstipulatum.

== Etymology ==
Pelargonium comes from the Greek; Pelargos which means stork. Another name for pelargoniums is storksbills due to the shape of their fruit. Album refers to the white flowers.

== Description ==
Pelargonium album is a small, semi-succulent plant that grows in slightly shaded areas in the Pilgrim's Rest area of South Africa. It grows to about 15 cm (5.9 in) high and 40 cm (16 in) wide and has small white flowers.
