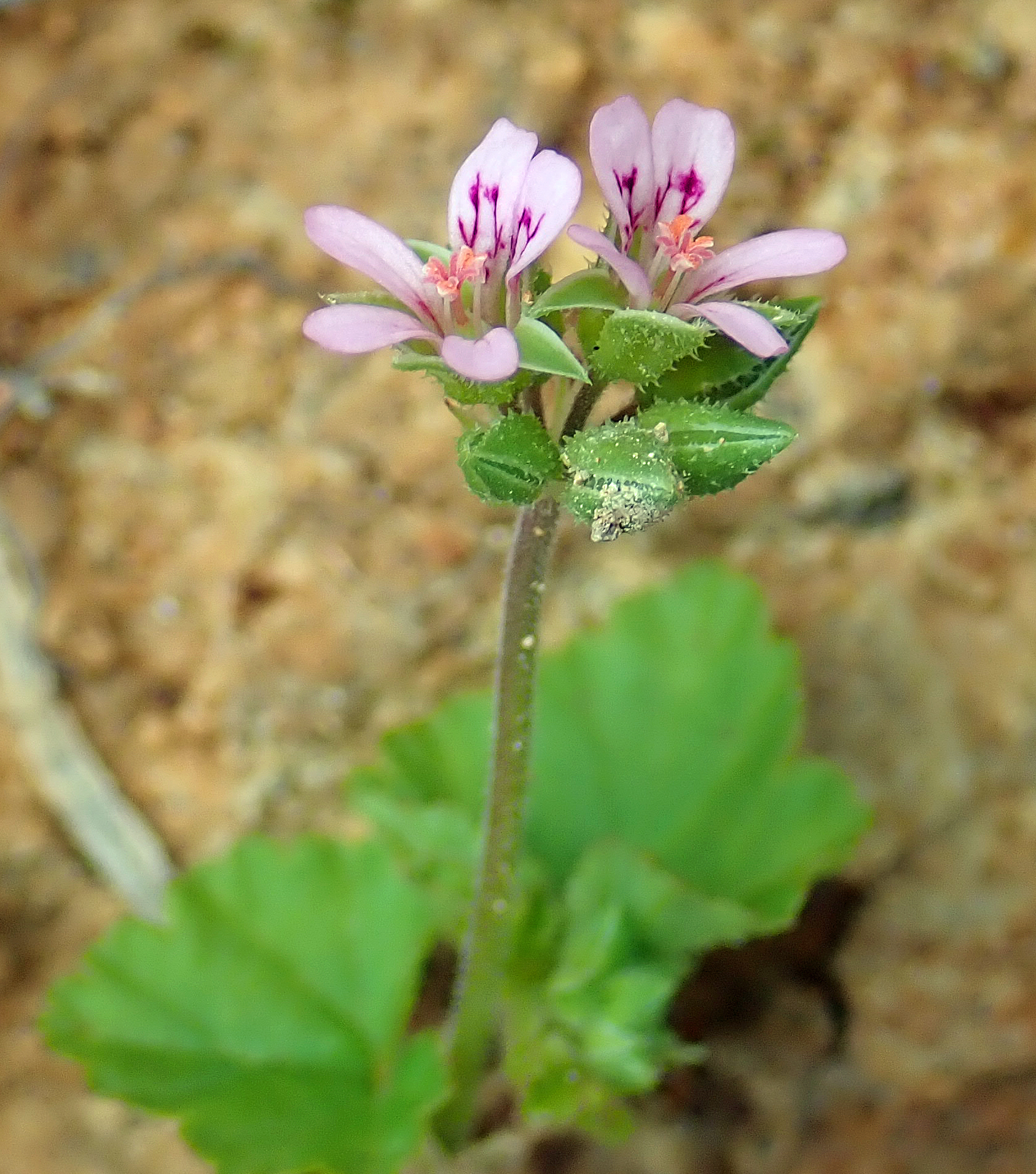

Scientific classification
- Kingdom: Plantae
- Clade: Tracheophytes
- Clade: Angiosperms
- Clade: Eudicots
- Clade: Rosids
- Order: Geraniales
- Family: Geraniaceae
- Genus: Pelargonium
- Species: P. inodorum

Binomial name
- Pelargonium inodorum Willd.

= Pelargonium inodorum =

Wild pelargonium

Species of plant

Pelargonium inodorum, commonly known as wild pelargonium, is a flowering plant in the family Geraniaceae. It is grows in New South Wales, Queensland, Tasmania, Victoria, New Zealand (including the Chatham Islands). It has scented leaves and mostly pink flowers.

== Description ==
Pelargonium inodorum is a perennial or short-lived aromatic herb up to 35 cm (14 in) high, softly hairy and thick taproots. The leaves are arranged opposite, oval to heart-shaped, 1–4 cm (0.39–1.57 in) long, 1–5 cm (0.39–1.97 in) wide, occasionally with 5-7 rounded lobes, upper surface maybe smooth or both surfaces with occasional hairs and on a petiole 1–5 cm (0.39–1.97 in) long. The flowers are borne in clusters of 3-14 on a peduncle 3–8 cm (1.2–3.1 in) long, pedicels 1–3 mm (0.039–0.118 in) long, larger when fruiting. The petals are pink with darker purple or pink markings, 2–4 mm (0.079–0.157 in) long and calyx lobes 2–4 mm (0.079–0.157 in) long. Flowering occurs mostly in summer and the fruit is a schizocarp 10–14 mm (0.39–0.55 in) long and covered in soft, thin, separated hairs.

== Taxonomy ==
Pelargonium inodorum was first formally described in 1804 by Carl Ludwig von Willdenow and the description was published in Hortus Berolinensis.

== Distribution and habitat ==
Wild pelargonium is a widespread species found growing in moist low lying areas to montane woodlands in New South Wales, Queensland, New South Wales, Victoria and the Australian Capital Territory.
