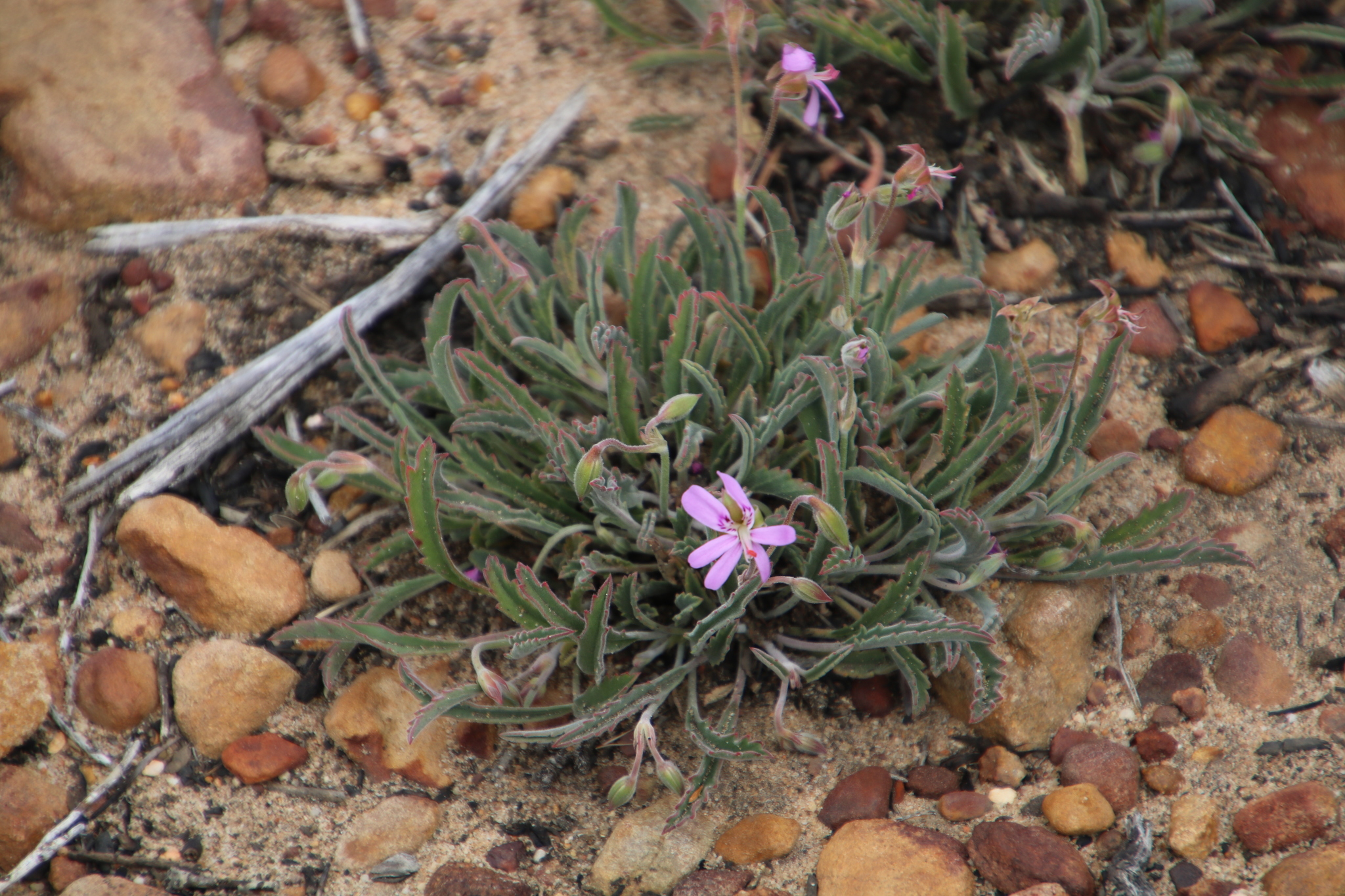

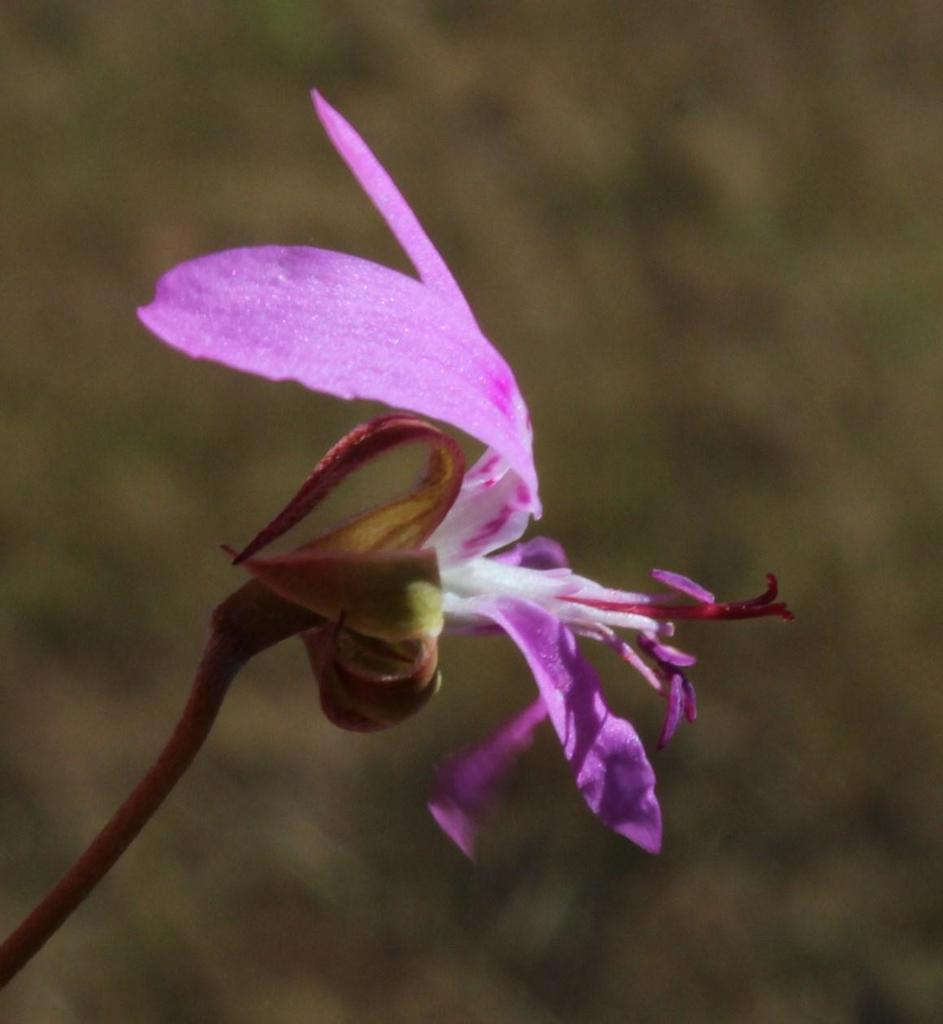

Scientific classification
- Kingdom: Plantae
- Clade: Embryophytes
- Clade: Tracheophytes
- Clade: Angiosperms
- Clade: Eudicots
- Clade: Rosids
- Order: Geraniales
- Family: Geraniaceae
- Genus: Pelargonium
- Species: P. coronopifolium

Binomial name
- Pelargonium coronopifolium (Jacq.)

Synonyms
- Geranium coronopifolium; G. ellipticum, P. ellipticum; Campylia staticephylla, C. staticaefolium; P. coronopifolium var. lineare; P. gramineum; P. angustissimum

= Pelargonium coronopifolium =

Species of plant from western South Africa

Pelargonium coronopifolium is a subshrub of up to 40 cm (1 1/3 ft) high. It has green to slightly greyish, linear to narrowly elliptical leaves often with irregular teeth towards the tip and white to purple flowers in groups of one to four. It can be found in the Western Cape province of South Africa. Old publications suggested the name buck's horn plantain-leaved stork's bill, but this name never gained common use.

== Description ==
Pelargonium coronopifolium is a diploid with a base chromosome number of 10 (2n=20). It is an upright, herbaceous subshrub with main stems of up to 40 cm (1 1/3 ft) high, that are rough under the level of the leaves because of the remains of old leaves and stipules. A plant may sprout several stems from the underground rootstock. All above-ground parts are covered in short hairs that are pressed stifly against the surface, and fewer glandular hairs, except for the pistils, stamens, staminodes, petals, and the inside of the sepals. The leaves are green to slightly greyish in colour, with a flat to V-shaped leaf blade that has a linear to narrowly elliptical outline, usually 3–8 cm (1.2–3.1 in) long (full range 2–17 cm (0.79–6.69 in)), and 1–7 mm (0.039–0.276 in) wide (rarely up to 1 cm (0.39 in)). It gradually narrows into the petiole, has a short sharp tip, and the margin is entire or has irregular teeth near the tip. The leaf stem is shorter than the leaf blade, 3–30 mm (0.12–1.18 in) long (rarely up to 5 cm (2.0 in)), with a groove on the upper side. At the leaf base are two reddish-brown, awl-shaped stipules of 2–10 mm (0.079–0.394 in) long and 1–3 mm (0.039–0.118 in) wide.

The inflorescence stalks are 3–6 cm (1 1/5–2 2/5 in) (rarely up to 14 cm (5 3/5 in)) long and each carry two or three, sometimes one or four, zygomorphic flowers on 2–4 cm (4/5–1 3/5 in) (rarely up to 5 cm (2.0 in)) long flower stalks. Each flower has 5 green to reddish-brown sepals that are merged into a tube at base about ¼ as long as the pedicel, are oval in outline, 4–10 mm (0.16–0.39 in) long and 2–3 mm (0.079–0.118 in) and with a pointy tip. Each flower has 5 white, pink or purple petals. Two petals that are usually pointing upwards are 7–18 mm (0.28–0.71 in) long and 2–7 mm (0.079–0.276 in) wide, consisting of a teardrop-shaped part (or plate) at the top with darker markings, and a narrow basal part (or claw) with side extensions (or ears). Three petals usually pointing down or forwards are without markings, elliptic in outline with a narrow claw, 4–14 mm (0.16–0.55 in) long and 1.5–3 mm (0.059–0.118 in) wide. Each flower has 2 long, 2 medium and 1 short fertile stamens topped with anthers with yellow to orange pollen (best checked in the bud), and 5 infertile, glabrous and flattened staminodes, two of which are sometimes slightly bent backwards. At their base, the filaments of the stamens and staminodes are merged into a column of 1.5–2.5 mm (0.059–0.098 in) long. The storkbill-shaped fruit eventually splits into 5 mericarps each with a capsule 5–6 mm (0.20–0.24 in) long containing a single seed and tail of 30–33 mm (1.2–1.3 in) long.

=== Differences with related species ===
P. coronopifolium can be distinguished from P. caespitosum which usually has only 4 petals (not always 5), a hardly developed hypanthium (not 2–8 mm long), stamens reaching below the anterior petals (not above), and leaf stalks than may me longer or shorter than the leaf blade (not leaf stalk always shorter).

In P. oenothera the claws of the largest upwardly directed petals lack lobes and the plate is flat (not claws of the upper petals eared and not plate flat or folded forwards).

P. tricolor has leaf stalks that may me longer or shorter than the leaf blades and the upper petals have three differently colours due to warty spots (not just one colour and without warty spots), as well as upper petal claws without ears and plates flat.

P. elegans has leaf stalks longer than the leaf blades (not shorter), upper petal claws without ears and plates flat (not with ears and plate flat ore folded) and 7 fertile stamens (not just 5, check in fresh flowers, anthers are quickly shed).

P. capillare has leaf stalks always longer than the leaf blades (not shorter), the upper petals have two different colours due to warty spots (not unicoloured without warty spots), and 7 fertile stamens (not just 5).

P. ovale has 3 straight and 2 short, hook-shaped staminodes, and leaf stalks longer than leaf blades (not 5 straight staminodes and shorter leaf stalks).

== Taxonomy ==
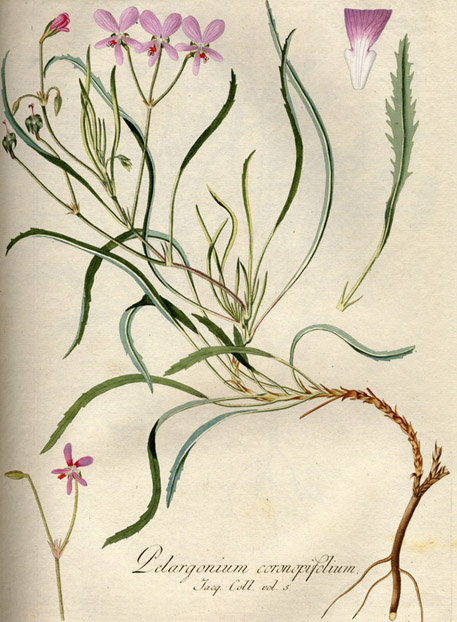
Etching from volume 3 Icones plantarum rariorum (1794) by Nikolaus Joseph von Jacquin; note the ears on the claw of the largest petals

Nikolaus Joseph von Jacquin first described this species in part 3 of his publication lcones Plantarum Rariorum of 1794, giving it the name Pelargonium coronopifolium. He based it on a herbarium specimen from an unknown location and collector, but annotated in his own handwriting. In 1803, Gábor Andreánszky reassigned it to the genus Geranium, creating the combination Geranium coronopifolium. The "father of South African botany", Carl Peter Thunberg described another plant from his own collection, from Caput Bonae-Spei (a term used at that time for the larger Cape region), but again from an unknown collector, and he called it Geranium ellipticum in 1823. Already in 1824, the famous Swiss botanist Augustin Pyramus de Candolle reassigned Thunberg's plant to the genus Pelargonium, making the new combination P. ellipticum. In 1835, Christian Friedrich Ecklon and Karl Ludwig Philipp Zeyher described a plant they had collected themselves at Heerenlogement in the Cape Province, and assigned it to the genus Campylia that had been erected by Robert Sweet in 1820, calling it Campylia staticephylla. Ernst Gottlieb von Steudel gave the new but illegitimate name Campylia staticaefolium to Ecklon and Zeyher's plant in 1841. William Henry Harvey in 1860 distinguished P. coronopifolium variety lineare. A form with narrow leaves from Gydo Pass was collected and described by Harry Bolus in 1889, who called it Pelargonium gramineum. A second form with narrow leaves, but flowering later in the season with white to pale pink flowers, found in the Cederberg Mountains was named by Reinhard Knuth Pelargonium angustissimum. He described it in a book by Ernst Heinrich Friedrich Meyer in 1912. Since the structure of the flowers of all these forms is identical, they have the same number of chromosomes, the extremes in leaf shape grade into each other and the distribution is not disjunct, J.J.A. van der Walt and Loretta van Zyl-Hugo in their revision of Pelargonium section Campylia of 1988, considered all of these names synonymous.

Pelargonium coronopifolium is assigned to the section Campylia. A recent comparison of homologous DNA resulted in the following relationship tree:

- section Campylia
  - P. oenothera
  - P. ocellatum
  - P. burgerianum
  - P. althaeoides
  - P. elegans
  - - P. capillare
    - P. ovale
    - P. tricolor
    - - P. caespitosum
      - P. coronopifolium

== Distribution, habitat and ecology ==
Pelargonium coronopifolium can be found in the Western Cape province, from the Gifberg through the Cederberg and Kouebokkeveld Mountains to Worcester, where it grows in arid fynbos on sandstone slopes. It occurs from about 150 m (490 ft) west of the Olifants river to approximately 1,400 m (4,600 ft) altitude in the Cederberg. The species is primarily pollinated by bees.

== Conservation ==
The continued survival of Pelargonium coronopifolium is considered to be of least concern because it is a widely distributed species that is not in decline.
