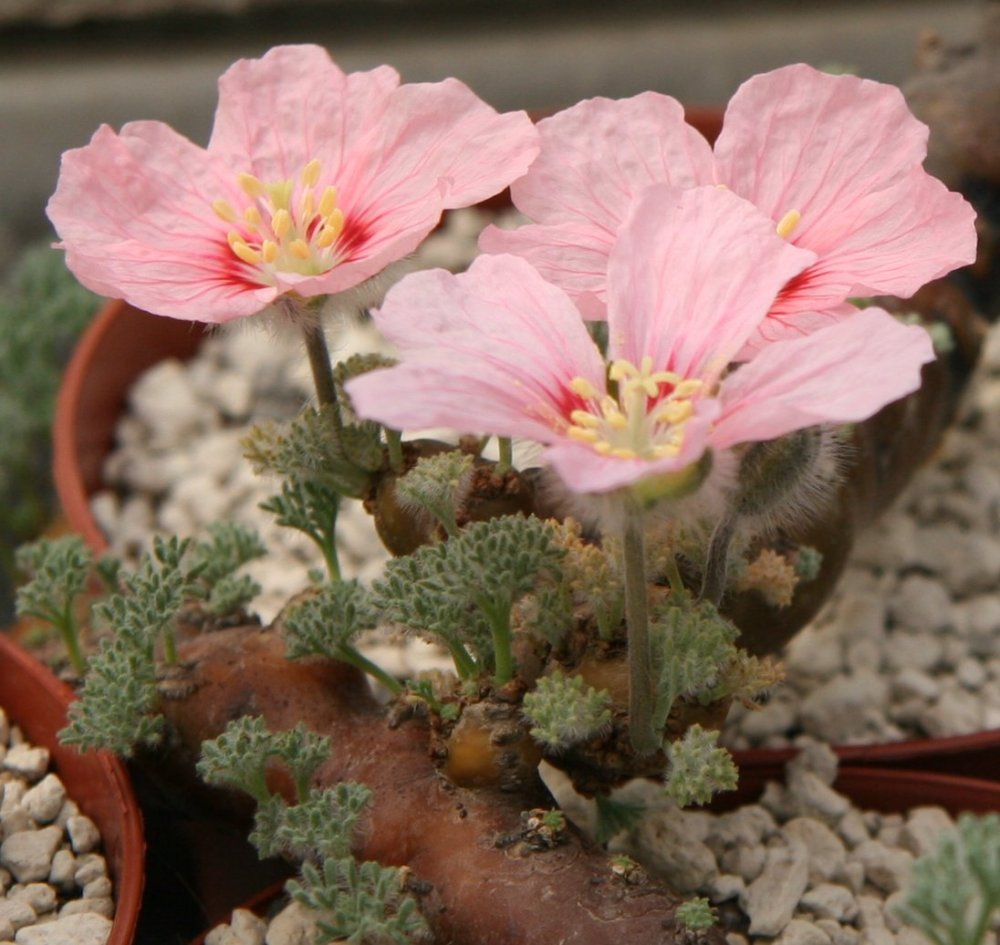
- Sarcocaulon multifidum

Scientific classification
- Kingdom: Plantae
- Clade: Tracheophytes
- Clade: Angiosperms
- Clade: Eudicots
- Clade: Rosids
- Order: Geraniales
- Family: Geraniaceae
- Genus: Sarcocaulon (DC.) Sweet

= Sarcocaulon =

Genus of plants

Sarcocaulon is a genus of flowering plants belonging to the family Geraniaceae.

Its native range is Angola to Southern Africa.

== Species ==
Species:

- Sarcocaulon camdeboense Moffett
- Sarcocaulon ciliatum Moffett
- Sarcocaulon flavescens S.E.A.Rehm
- Sarcocaulon herrei L.Bolus
- Sarcocaulon inerme S.E.A.Rehm
- Sarcocaulon lheritieri Sweet
- Sarcocaulon marlothii Engl.
- Sarcocaulon mossamedense (Welw. ex Oliv.) Hiern
- Sarcocaulon multifidum R.Knuth
- Sarcocaulon patersonii (DC.) G.Don
- Sarcocaulon peniculinum Moffett
- Sarcocaulon salmoniflorum Moffett
- Sarcocaulon spinosum (Burm.f.) Kuntze
- Sarcocaulon vanderietiae L.Bolus
