= Pelargonium insularis =

Conservation status
- Critically Endangered (IUCN 3.1)

Scientific classification
- Kingdom: Plantae
- Clade: Tracheophytes
- Clade: Angiosperms
- Clade: Eudicots
- Clade: Rosids
- Order: Geraniales
- Family: Geraniaceae
- Genus: Pelargonium
- Species: P. insularis

Binomial name
- Pelargonium insularis Gibby & A.G.Mill.

Species of plant

Pelargonium insularis is a species of plant in the family Geraniaceae. It is endemic to the Samhah island in the Socotra Archipelago of Yemen. It was discovered in 1999 on the north-facing limestone escarpment on the island. It represents the first record of the genus from the Socotra Archipelago. At the time of its discovery only a single plant was found and an extensive search failed to find more. The cliffs in which it occurs are frequently enveloped in low cloud and provide a relatively moist refugium occupying less than 5 km2, on an otherwise desertic island. Local informants know of the plant and comment that it is found along the cliffs and when fresh, provides incidental grazing for livestock. Its natural habitat is rocky areas. It is threatened by habitat loss.

== Botanical notes ==
Most closely related to P. alchemilloides (a plant of SW Arabia and tropical NE Africa) from which it differs in its pink (not white) flowers and the development of a pronounced woody stock.
