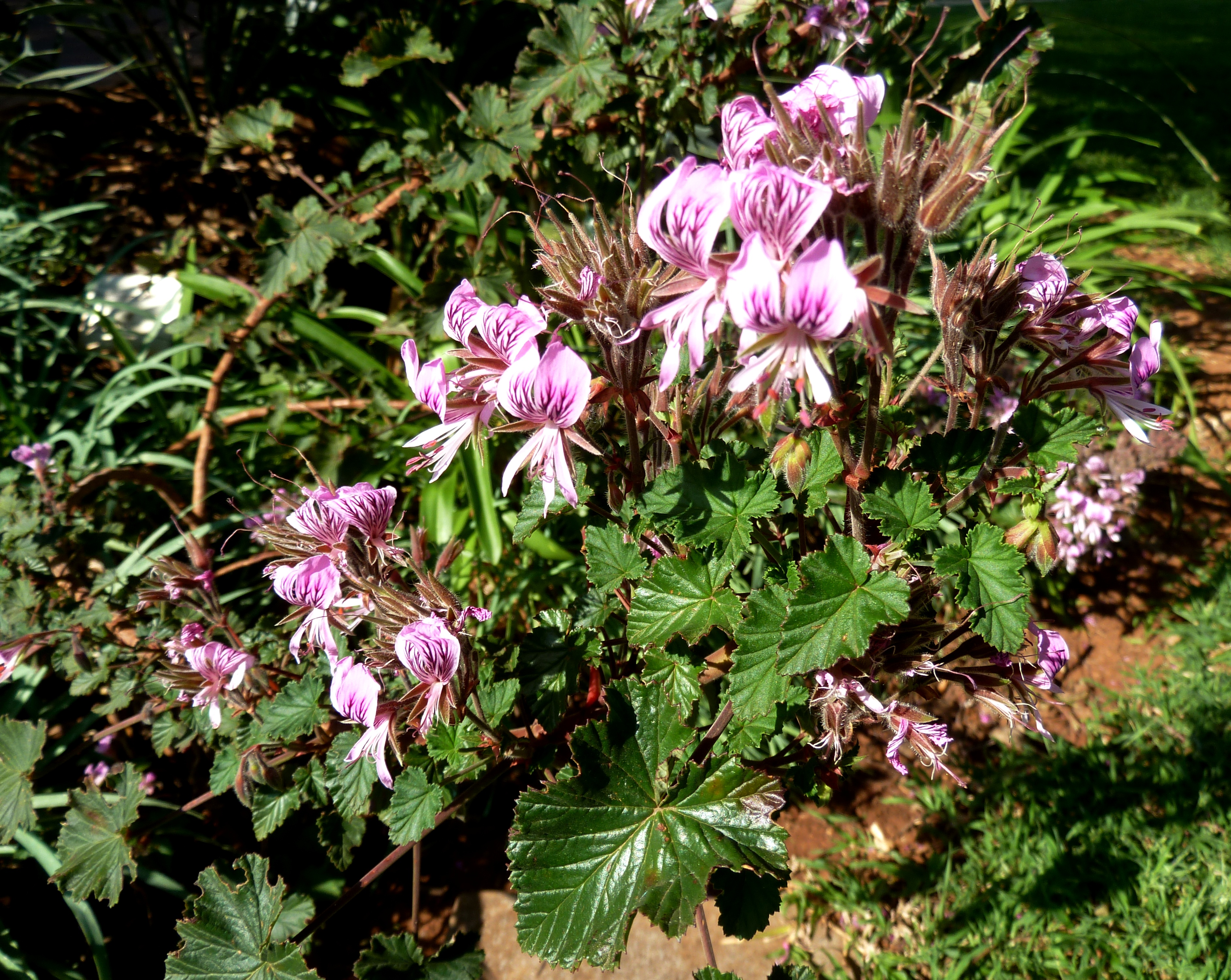

Scientific classification
- Kingdom: Plantae
- Clade: Embryophytes
- Clade: Tracheophytes
- Clade: Spermatophytes
- Clade: Angiosperms
- Clade: Eudicots
- Clade: Rosids
- Order: Geraniales
- Family: Geraniaceae
- Genus: Pelargonium
- Species: P. cordifolium

Binomial name
- Pelargonium cordifolium (Cav.) Curtis

Synonyms
- Pelargonium cordatum L'Hér.

= Pelargonium cordifolium =

Species of flowering plant

Pelargonium cordifolium is a plant endemic to the fynbos region of the Southern Cape of South Africa.

== Etymology ==
Pelargonium is from Ancient Greek πελαργός (pelargós = 'stork'). Another name for pelargonium is 'storksbill' after the shape of its fruit; 'cordifolium' refers to the heart-shaped leaves (cor/cordis being 'heart' in Latin).

== Description ==
Pelargonium cordifolium is a large, spreading species, growing up to 1.5 metres tall. It is a hairy plant with a slight apple scent and pale pink flowers with dark veins appearing from March to July. Its flat or curled, heart-shaped leaves are finely to coarsely toothed, entire or shallowly lobed, dark green on the upper surface and white-matted below. It is valued as a houseplant or as an outdoor perennial, climate permitting. Its leaves may be used in potpourris.

== Cultivars and hybrids ==
There are a few cultivars and hybrids of Pelargonium cordifolium. These include:

- Pelargonium cordifolium var. rubrocinctum - A variety with slightly paler leaves and reddish - pink flowers with maroon veins.
- Pelargonium cordifolium 'Caroline's Citrine' - A variety with golden leaves and dark blotches in the centre.
- Pelargonium cordifolium 'Donn's Goldstrike' - A variety with golden leaves similar to P.'Caroline's Citrine' but without the dark green blotches.

== Gallery ==
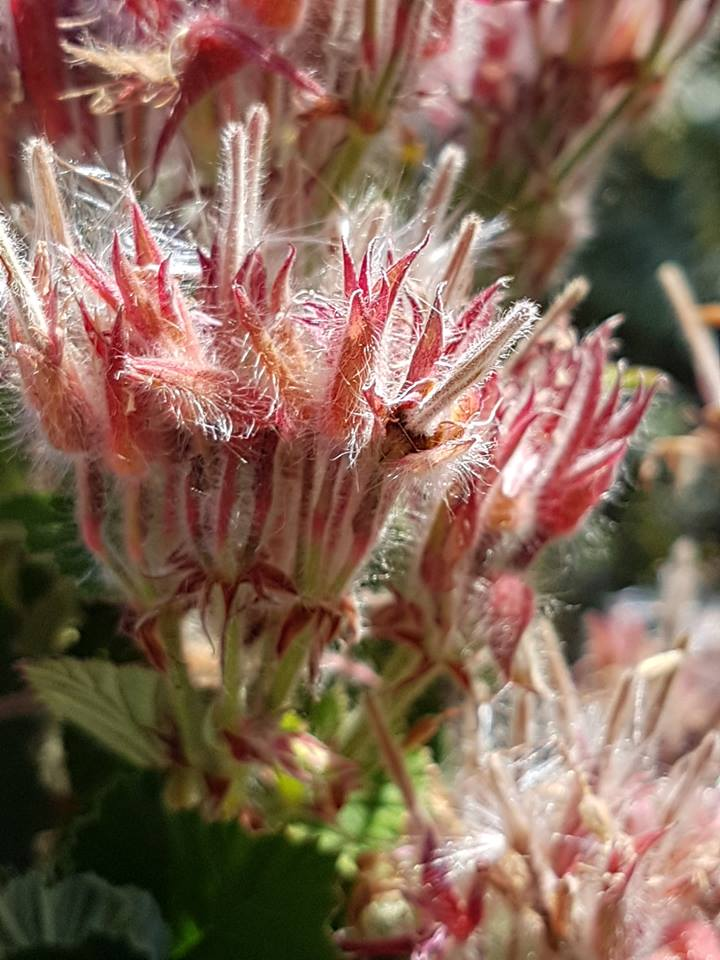
Fruiting heads

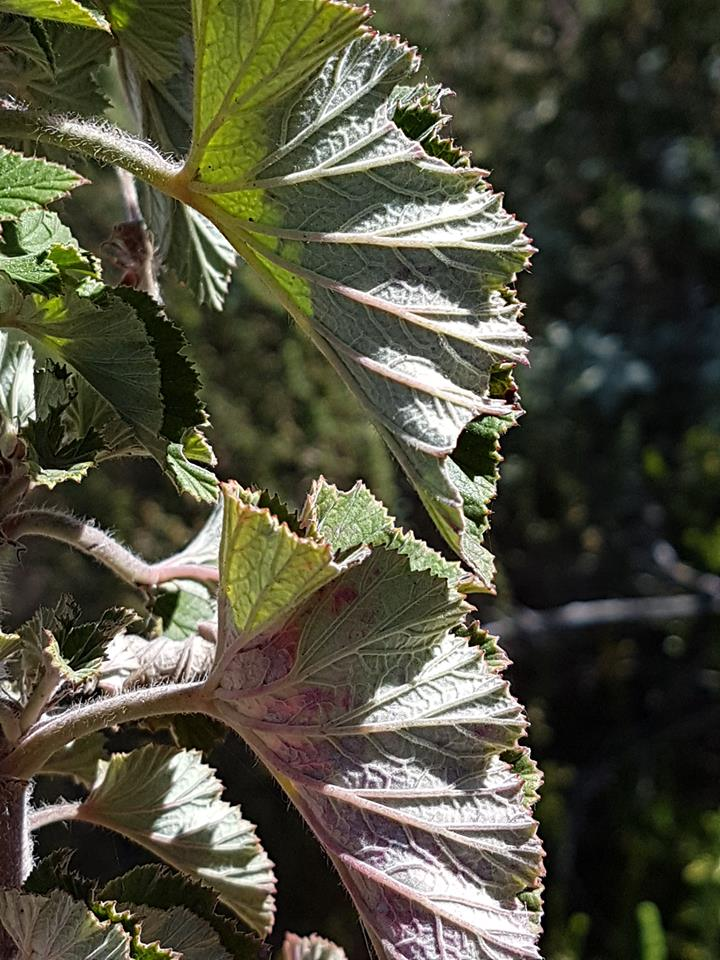
Leaves

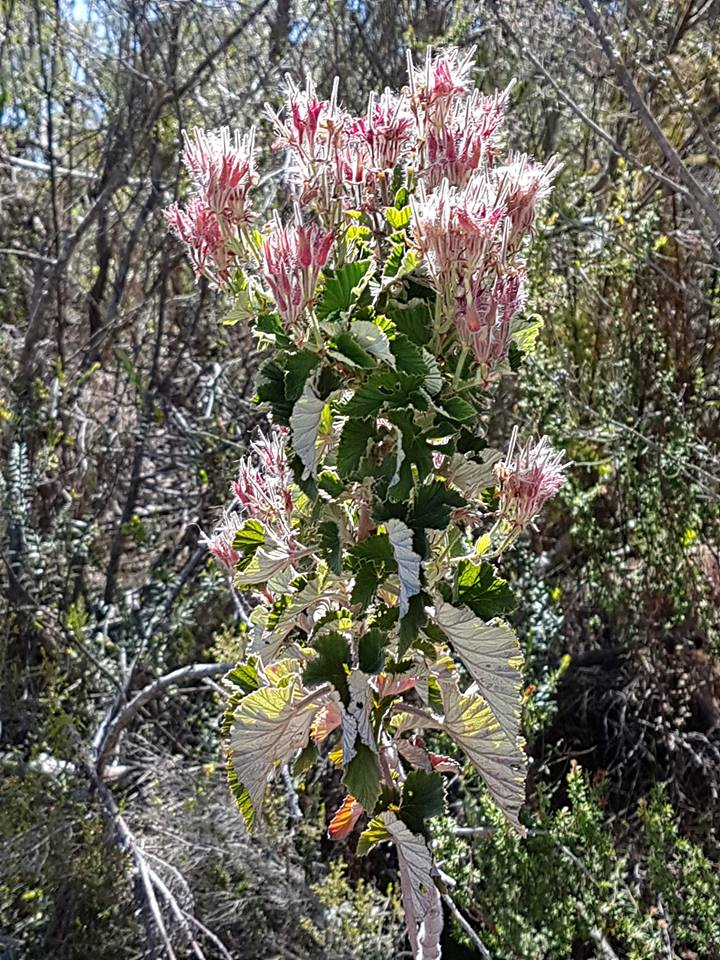
Habit
