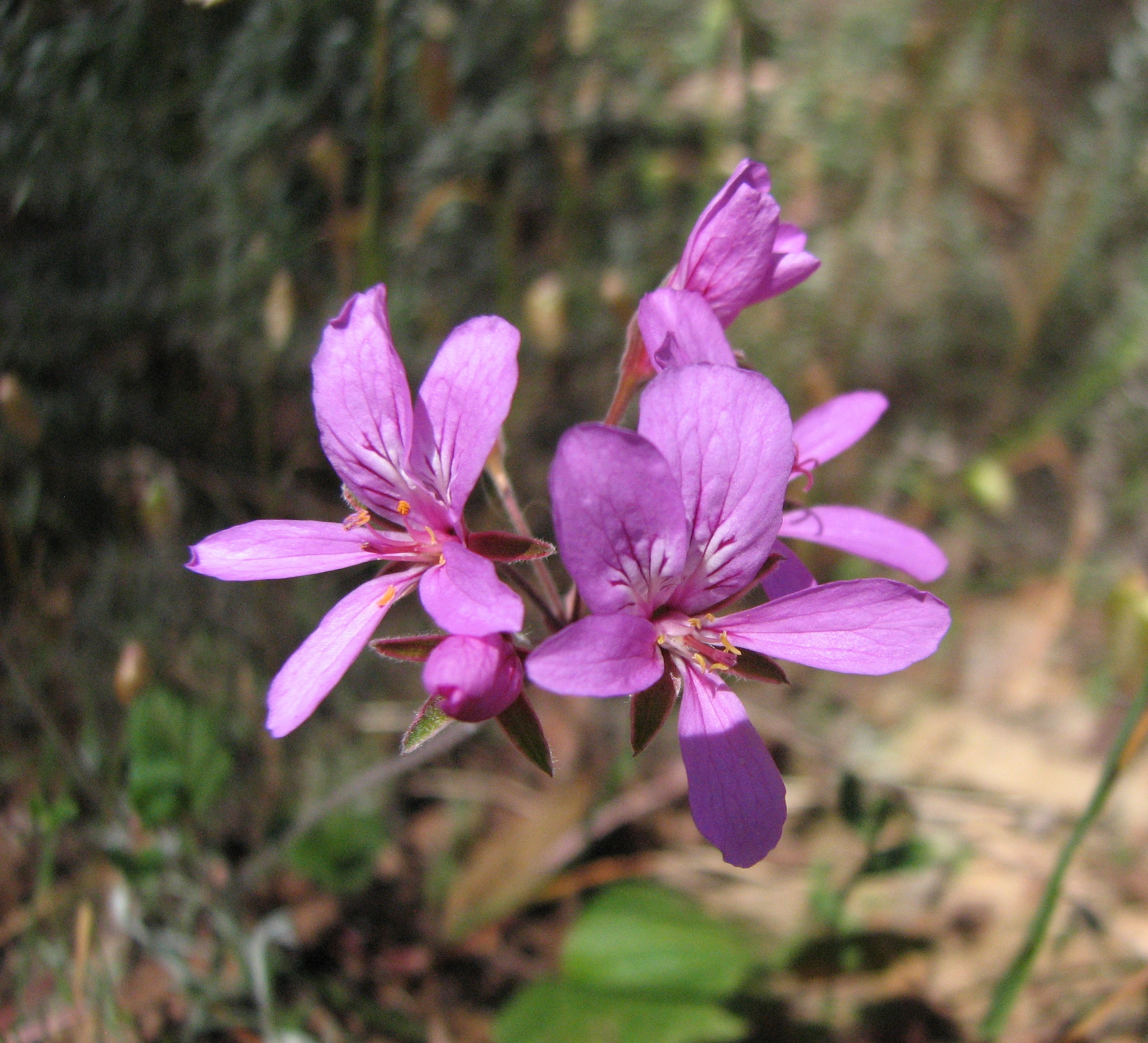

Scientific classification
- Kingdom: Plantae
- Clade: Tracheophytes
- Clade: Angiosperms
- Clade: Eudicots
- Clade: Rosids
- Order: Geraniales
- Family: Geraniaceae
- Genus: Pelargonium
- Species: P. rodneyanum

Binomial name
- Pelargonium rodneyanum Lindl.

= Pelargonium rodneyanum =

Species of plant

Pelargonium rodneyanum, commonly known as magenta storksbill, is a perennial herb species that is endemic to Australia. It grows to 40 cm high and has leaves with 5 to 7 shallow lobes. Dark pink flowers appear between October and February in the species native range.

The species was first formally described in 1838 by English botanist John Lindley in the second volume of Thomas Mitchell's Three Expeditions into the interior of Eastern Australia.

It occurs on rocky slopes in forested areas of New South Wales, Victoria and South Australia.

In cultivation, the species prefers a sunny position with good drainage. It tolerates a variety of soil conditions as well as periods of dryness and frost. It is suited to rockeries and can be grown in containers.
