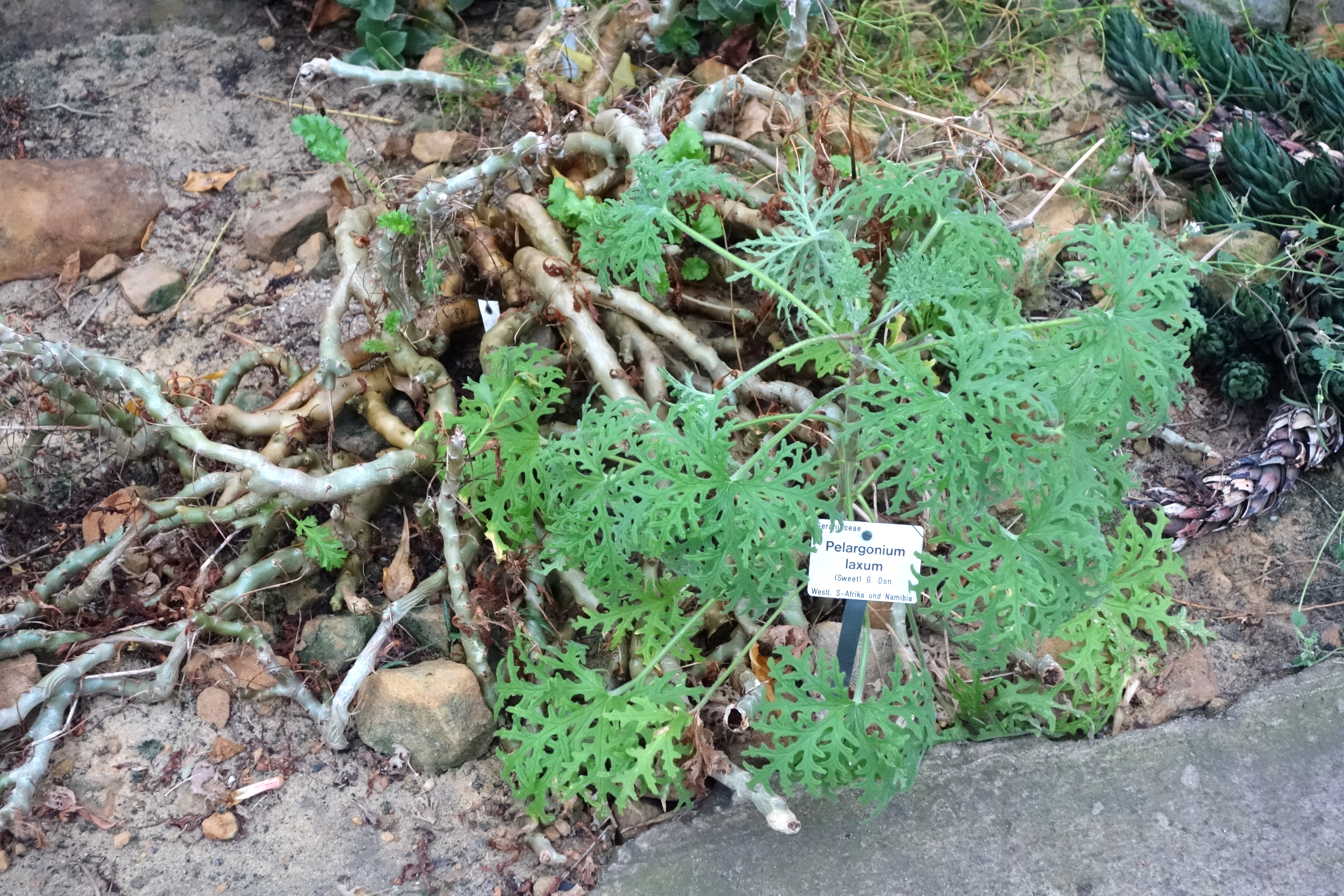

Scientific classification
- Kingdom: Plantae
- Clade: Tracheophytes
- Clade: Angiosperms
- Clade: Eudicots
- Clade: Rosids
- Order: Geraniales
- Family: Geraniaceae
- Genus: Pelargonium
- Species: P. laxum

Binomial name
- Pelargonium laxum G.Don

= Pelargonium laxum =

Species of flowering plant

Pelargonium laxum is a species of South African erect, branched-stem succulent plant that grows to 30 cm in height.

The name was listed as unresolved by The Plant List as of March 2015.
