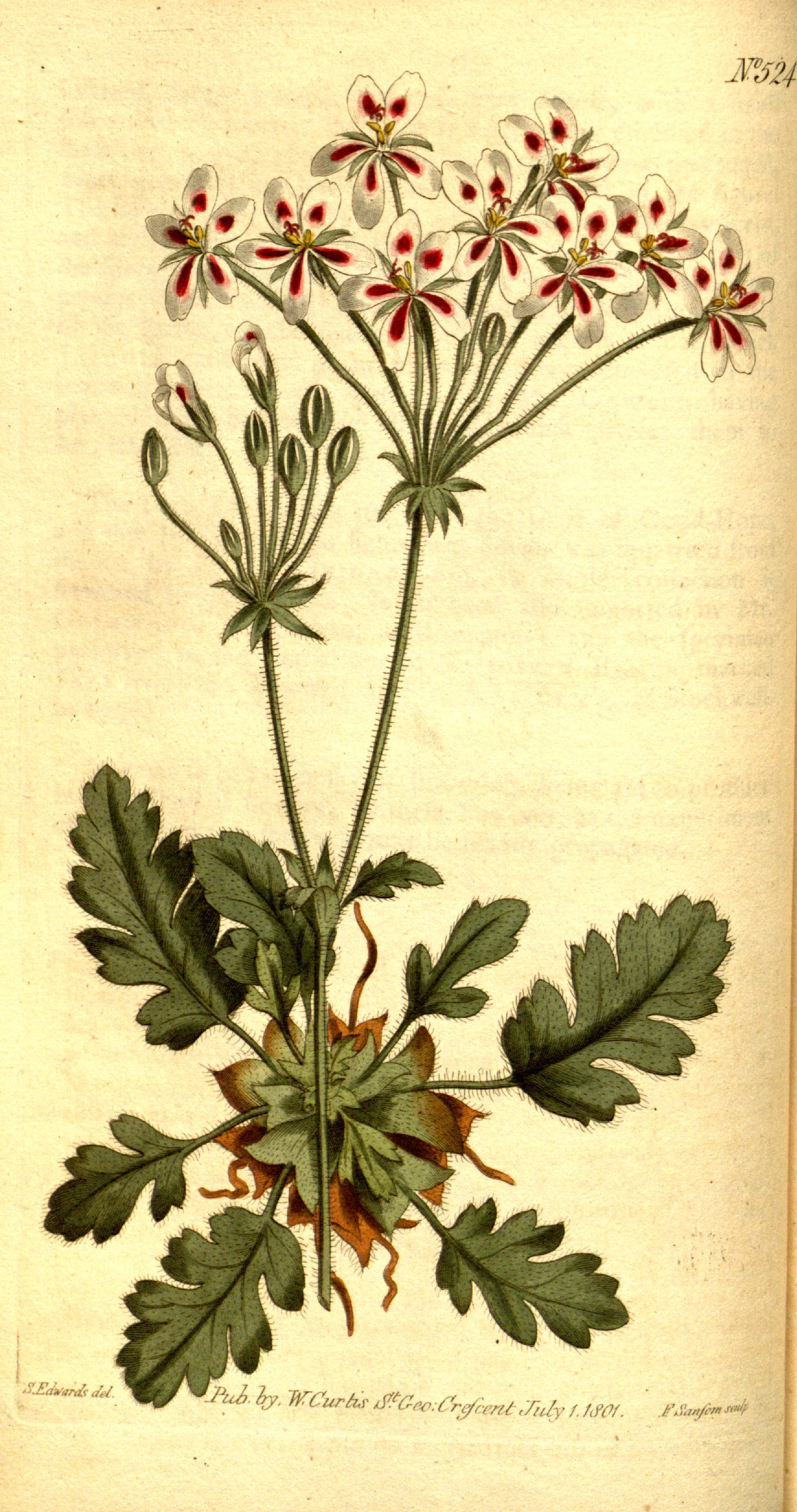
- An illustration of P. pulchellum

Scientific classification
- Kingdom: Plantae
- Clade: Tracheophytes
- Clade: Angiosperms
- Clade: Eudicots
- Clade: Rosids
- Order: Geraniales
- Family: Geraniaceae
- Genus: Pelargonium
- Species: P. pulchellum

Binomial name
- Pelargonium pulchellum Sims

Synonyms
- Geraniospermum pulchellum (Sims) Kuntze; Geranium pictum Andr.; Geranium pulchellum (Sims) Poir.; Hoarea pulchella (Sims) Sweet; Pelargonium curtisianum Balb. & Spin ex DC.; Pelargonium curtisii Jacq. ex F.G.Dietr.; Pelargonium pictum (Andr.) Pers.; Pelargonium rubromaculatum Andr.; Pelargonium rubromaculatum Pers.

= Pelargonium pulchellum =

Species of flowering plant

Pelargonium pulchellum, known as the Nonesuch pelargonium, is a member of the family Geraniaceae found in the Northern Cape province of South Africa.
