= Pelargonium papilionaceum =

- Close-up of flowers
- Habit

Scientific classification
- Kingdom: Plantae
- Clade: Tracheophytes
- Clade: Angiosperms
- Clade: Eudicots
- Clade: Rosids
- Order: Geraniales
- Family: Geraniaceae
- Genus: Pelargonium
- Species: P. papilionaceum

Binomial name
- Pelargonium papilionaceum (L.) L'Hér.

Synonyms
- Geraniospermum papilionaceum (L.) Kuntze; Geranium papilionaceum L.

Species of plant

Pelargonium papilionaceum, the butterfly geranium, is a species of flowering plant in the family Geraniaceae. It is native to the southwestern Cape Provinces of South Africa. A tender perennial subshrub, it has gained the Royal Horticultural Society's Award of Garden Merit.
