= Pelargonium dolomiticum =

Scientific classification
- Kingdom: Plantae
- Clade: Tracheophytes
- Clade: Angiosperms
- Clade: Eudicots
- Clade: Rosids
- Order: Geraniales
- Family: Geraniaceae
- Genus: Pelargonium
- Species: P. dolomiticum

Binomial name
- Pelargonium dolomiticum R.Knuth

Synonyms
- Pelargonium bechuanicum Burtt Davy; Pelargonium juttae Dinter

Species of flowering plant

Pelargonium dolomiticum is a species of geranium. It is a tuberous geophyte native to Namibia, Botswana, Eswatini, and the Northern Provinces and Free State of South Africa in southern Africa. The species can be found on dolomite or disturbed areas. It prefers well-drained sandy soil in grasslands. It is a much-branched herbaceous shrublet that dies back in winter.

== Gallery ==
Flower

Fruit

Coiled up seed

Coiled seeds protruding from fruit body.

Leaf
