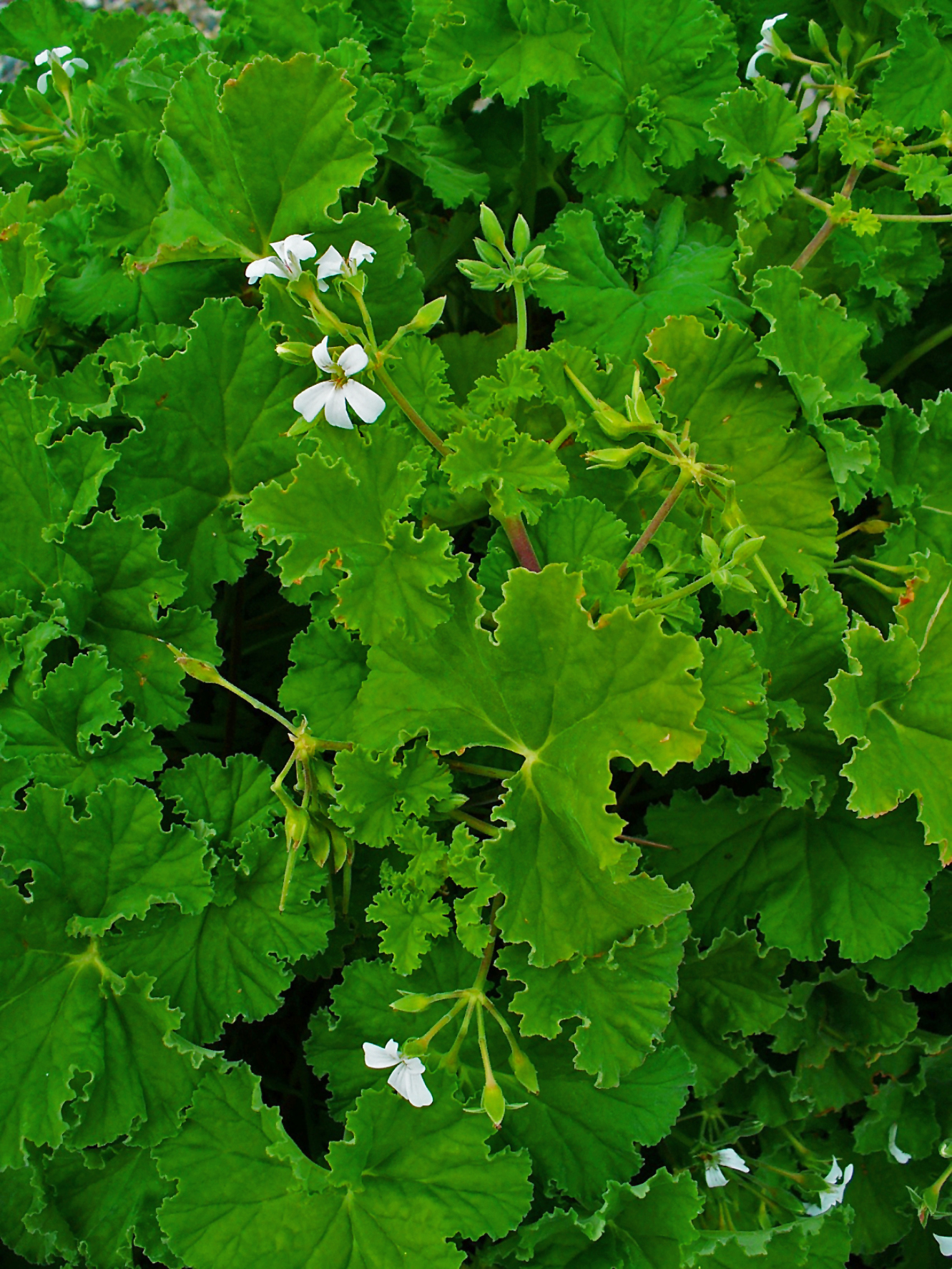

Scientific classification
- Kingdom: Plantae
- Clade: Tracheophytes
- Clade: Angiosperms
- Clade: Eudicots
- Clade: Rosids
- Order: Geraniales
- Family: Geraniaceae
- Genus: Pelargonium
- Subgenus: Pelargonium subg. Reniformia
- Species: P. odoratissimum

Binomial name
- Pelargonium odoratissimum (L.) L'Hér.

= Pelargonium odoratissimum =

Species of flowering plant

Pelargonium odoratissimum is a pelargonium species native to South Africa. It is also known as the apple geranium or apple pelargonium due to the distinct apple scent. It is in the subgenus Reniforme along with Pelargonium sidoides and Pelargonium exstipulatum.

== Etymology ==
Pelargonium comes from the Greek; Pelargos which means stork. Another name for pelargoniums is storksbills due to the shape of their fruit. Odoratissimum refers to the highly scented leaves.

== Description ==
Pelargonium odoratissimum is a small, spreading species which only grows up to 30 cm high and 60 cm wide. It has small pale pink flowers and its leaves are waxy, green and ovate.

== Cultivars and hybrids ==
There are quite a few cultivars and hybrids of Pelargonium odoratissimum. These cultivars and hybrids include:

- Pelargonium odoratissimum 'Big Apple' - A variety with larger leaves and a "Granny Smith" apple scent.
- Pelargonium odoratissimum 'Fringed Apple' - A variety with a slight hint of mint as well as apple fragrance.
- Pelargonium × fragrans - A hybrid between P. odoratissimum and Pelargonium exstipulatum. It has spicy, eucalyptus scented leaves. A popular cultivar of this is P. 'Old Spice' which smells as the name suggests; of Old Spice.
- Pelargonium 'Lillan Pottinger' - An apple scented hybrid of P. odoratissimum and P. × fragrans .

== Uses ==
As well as being a houseplant or outdoor perennial depending on climate, Pelargonium odoratissimum other uses. It is used for its astringent, tonic and antiseptic effects. It is used internally for debility, gastroenteritis, and hemorrhage and externally for skin complaints, injuries, and neuralgia and throat infections. The essential oil is used in aromatherapy and has a delicious apple aroma. It is also used to balance the hormonal system, menstrual flow, and clean the body of toxins.

In Cyprus the leaves are used to flavour cake and pastry syrups. It also sometimes preserved and eaten as a spoon sweet (glyko tou koutaliou).
