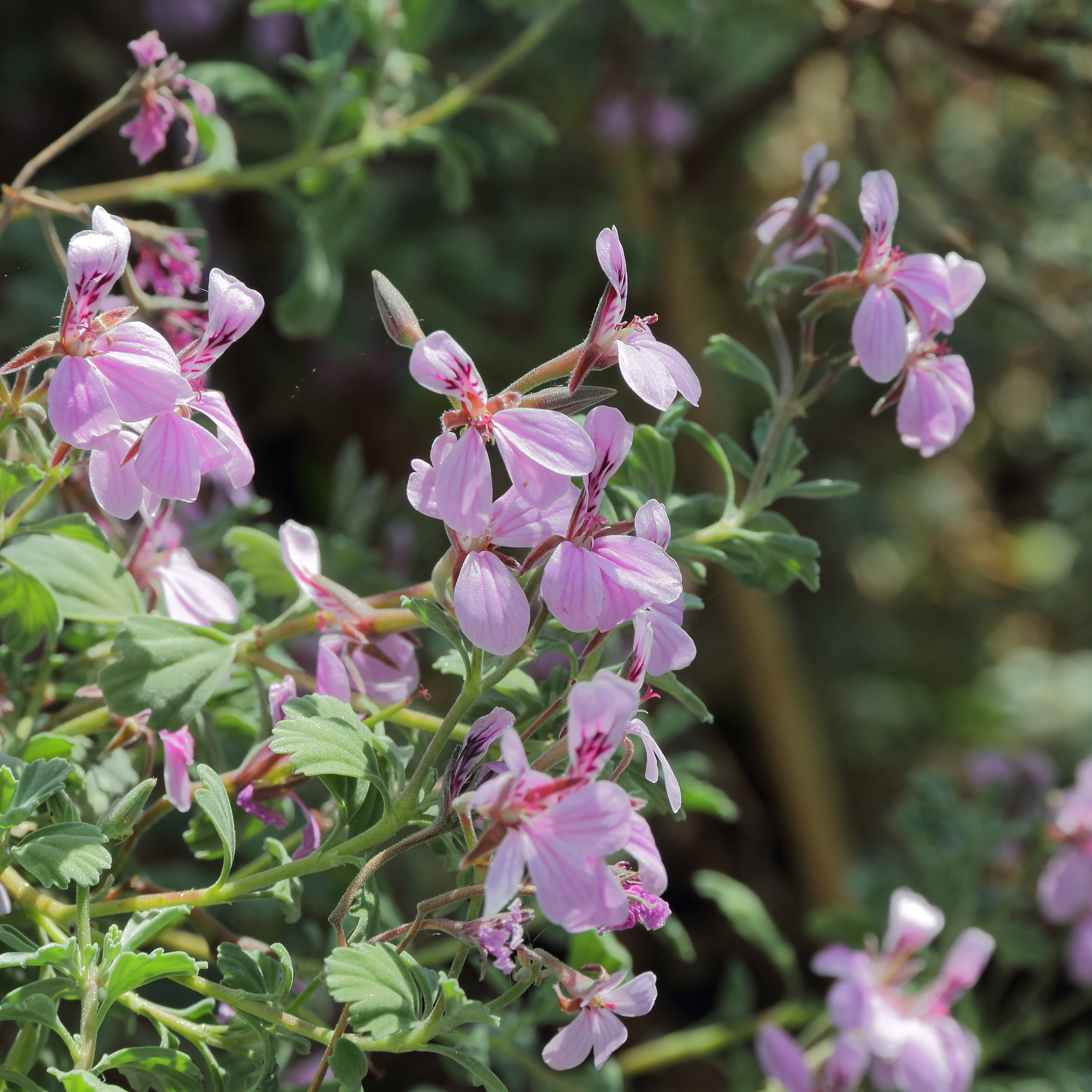

Scientific classification
- Kingdom: Plantae
- Clade: Tracheophytes
- Clade: Angiosperms
- Clade: Eudicots
- Clade: Rosids
- Order: Geraniales
- Family: Geraniaceae
- Genus: Pelargonium
- Species: P. exstipulatum

Binomial name
- Pelargonium exstipulatum (Cav.) L'Hér.

= Pelargonium exstipulatum =

Species of flowering plant

Pelargonium exstipulatum is a pelargonium species native to South Africa. It is in the subgenus Reniforme along with Pelargonium odoratissimum and Pelargonium sidoides.

== Etymology ==
Pelargonium comes from the Greek; Pelargos which means stork. Another name for pelargoniums is storksbills due to the shape of their fruit. Exstipulatum refers to the lack of Stipules on the leaves.

== Description ==
Pelargonium exstipulatum is a tall, quite woody, 'shrublet' which grows up to metre high and 50 cm wide. It has small pink flowers and its leaves are waxy, green and ovate with a slight fringe. Its leaves have a sweet, slightly spicy scent.

== Cultivars and hybrids ==
There are only a few cultivars and hybrids of Pelargonium odoratissimum, these include:

- Pelargonium × fragrans - A hybrid between P. exstipulatum and P.odoratissimum.
- There are many varieties and cultivars of P. × fragrans. For a detailed list, see Pelargonium × fragrans

== Uses ==
As well as being a houseplant or outdoor perennial depending on climate, the leaves of Pelargonium exstipulatum can be used in something like potpourri as they are quite aromatic.
