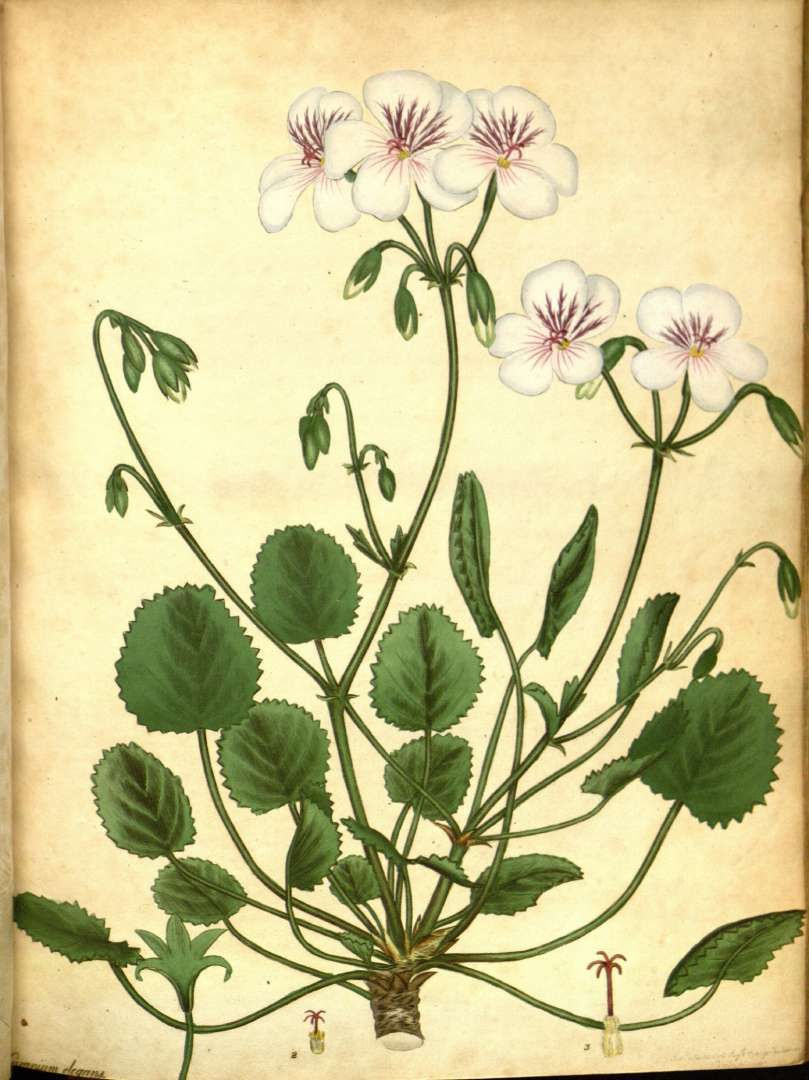

Conservation status
- Least Concern (SANBI Red List)

Scientific classification
- Kingdom: Plantae
- Clade: Tracheophytes
- Clade: Angiosperms
- Clade: Eudicots
- Clade: Rosids
- Order: Geraniales
- Family: Geraniaceae
- Genus: Pelargonium
- Species: P. elegans

Binomial name
- Pelargonium elegans (Andrews) Willd., 1800

Synonyms
- Campylia elegans Colv. ex Sweet, 1826; Eumorpha elegans (Andrews) Eckl. & Zeyh., 1834-1835; Geranium elegans Andrews, 1798; Geraniospermum elegans (Andrews) Kuntze, 1891; Pelargonium ovale subsp. ovatum Harv.

= Pelargonium elegans =

Species of flowering plant

Pelargonium elegans is a species of flowering plants in the family Geraniaceae.

== Taxonomy ==
Pelargonium elegans is included in section Campylia of subgenus Pelargonium.

== Description ==
The bloom's petals are pale pink to nearly white, with dark purple vertical lines on the two upper petals.

== Distribution ==
The plant is endemic to South Africa. It is found in Eastern Cape and Western Cape provinces, from Hermanus to Stilbaai, and from Port Elizabeth to Grahamstown.

Its major habitats are coastal Fynbos.

== Conservation ==
This species has lost coastal lowland subpopulations to urban development and competition from invasive species of plants. It is a Red List of South African Plants Least concern species. As of 2017, it is widespread over an estimated 49,000 square kilometres (12,000,000 acres), and is extant at more than 20 locations, but the population trend is decreasing.

== Cultivation ==
Pelargonium elegans is cultivated as an ornamental plant. It is an easy to grow plant in cultivation and can be grown outdoors if conditions are not freezing. As its natural habitat is dunes it is best suited for sandy soil.
