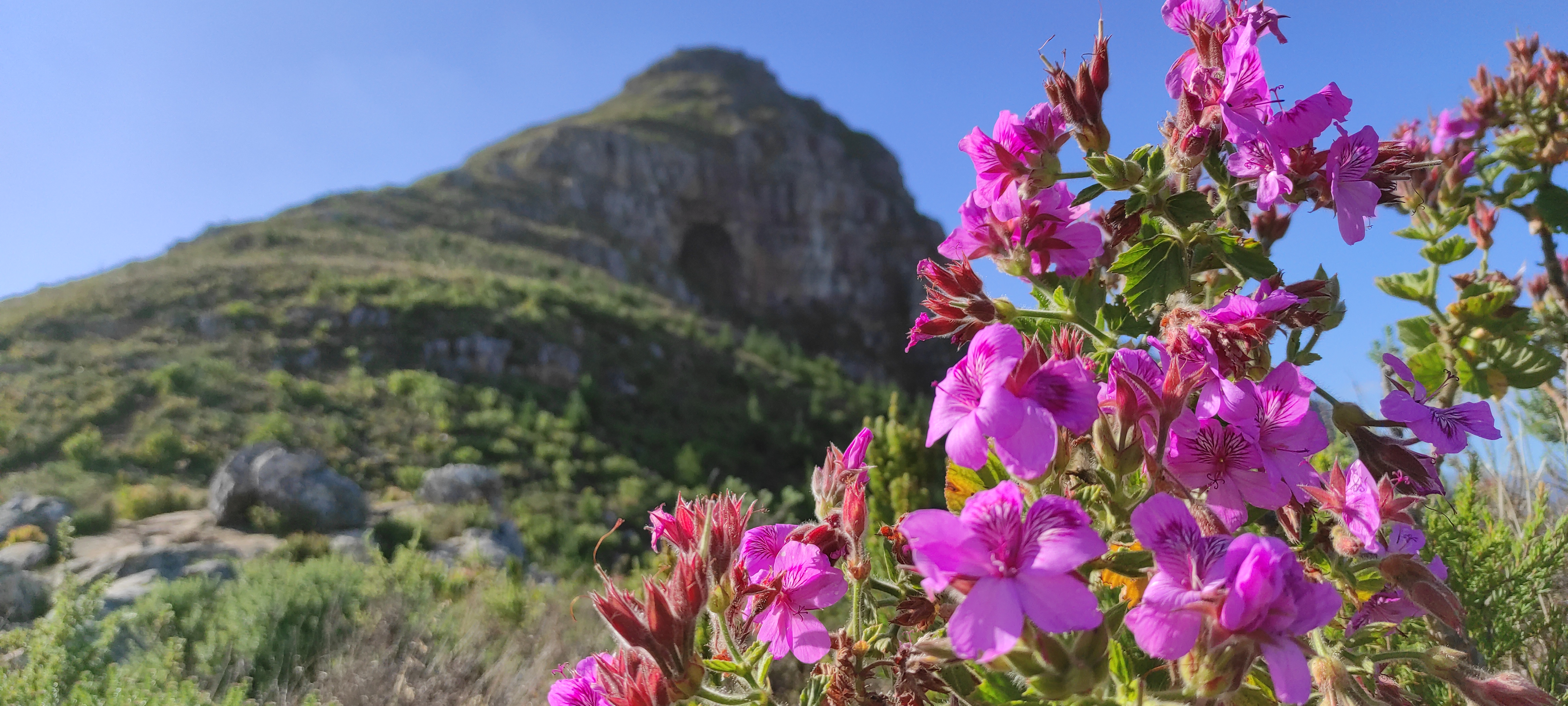
- Pelargonium cucullatum subsp. tabulare growing in its natural habitat on the slopes of the Cape Peninsula.

Scientific classification
- Kingdom: Plantae
- Clade: Tracheophytes
- Clade: Angiosperms
- Clade: Eudicots
- Clade: Rosids
- Order: Geraniales
- Family: Geraniaceae
- Genus: Pelargonium
- Species: P. cucullatum

Binomial name
- Pelargonium cucullatum (L.) L'Hér.

= Pelargonium cucullatum =

Species of plant from South Africa

Pelargonium cucullatum is a hairy, upright, branching, perennial shrub, of 1–2 m (3.3–6.6 ft) high, that has been assigned to the cranesbill family. It sprouts new stems from the underground rootstock and becomes woody at its base. It has alternately set, sometimes slightly succulent leaves crowded near the top of the branches, with leaf stalks and flat to hood-shaped leaf blades, with a rounded broad triangular to kidney-shaped outline of about 4–5.5 cm (1 3/5–2 1/5 in) long and 5–9 cm (2–3 3/5 in) wide, often somewhat incised, the margin with irregular teeth. The white to purplish red, 5-merous, somewhat mirror symmetrical flowers grow in umbel-like clusters, and each contain mostly 7 fertile stamens and 3 infertile staminodes (best checked in the bud) of different length. P. cucullatum has been cultivated as a garden ornamental and house plant since the 17th century. It has been used to breed many modern pelargonium hybrids, notably the Regal pelargoniums. It is called hooded-leaf pelargonium or herba althaea in English and wildemalva in Afrikaans.

== Description ==
Pelargonium cucullatum is a hairy, upright, branching, perennial shrub of 1–2 m (3.3–6.6 ft) high, with a taproots and underground runners from which intermittent shoots arise. It is fragrant when rubbed. The branches are initially herbaceous and greyish green but become eventually woody and brown. These are 6–10 mm (0.24–0.39 in) in diameter, and have a sparse to dense covering of long, soft (villous) hairs or straight hairs all pointing in the same direction (also called strigose), and some glandular hairs. The alternate leaves are crowding near the ends of branches and are hairy in the same manner as the branches. Each leaf is accompanied by two free, caducous, membranous, light green, ovate to narrowly ovate stipules of 5–10 mm (0.20–0.39 in) long and 3–7 mm (0.12–0.28 in) wide with a pointy tip, to the sides of the leaf stem. The leaf stem is mostly 20–55 mm (0.79–2.17 in) long (full range 8–90 mm (0.31–3.54 in)), with a groove on the somewhat flattened upper side. The undivided leaf blade is flat to cup-shaped, with a firm to somewhat succulent, rounded, broadly triangular to kidney-shaped outline of about 4–5.5 cm (1 3/5–2 1/5 in) long and 5–9 cm (2–3 3/5 in) wide, often somewhat incised, the margin with irregular teeth, particularly near the base, occasionally accentuated by a red line or a row of hairs, and a heart-shaped to wedge-shaped base. The veins are sunken below the upper leaf surface but stick out on the lower leaf surface.

The inflorescence is a branched flowering stem that bears up to 4 umbels with mostly 3-9, but sometimes as few as only one or as much as 13 flowers each. The flowering stem bears one or two small leaves and two to four green bracts at each branching. These bracts are oval to broadly oval with a pointy tip, 5–9 mm (0.20–0.35 in) long and 2–4 mm (0.079–0.157 in) wide, ovate to broadly ovate with acute apices, sparsely pilose to villous (especially abaxially and at the margins). The stems carrying the umbels (called peduncles) are green or tinged red, with many soft hairs and fewer glandular hairs, mostly 3–6 cm (1.2–2.4 in) long (full range 2–7 cm (0.79–2.76 in)) mm long. The peduncles are sometimes slightly curved when the flowers are stil the in bud, become upright when the flowers are open, and recurve or nod after flowering. The stems of the individual flowers (or pedicels) are green or reddish brown, felty hairy and 2–7 mm (0.079–0.276 in) or rarely up to 11 mm (0.43 in) mm long.

As in all Pelargonium species, the posterior sepal is fused with the pedicel forming the nectary tube or hypanthium, and in P. cucullatum, it is 5–12 mm (0.20–0.47 in) long, felty hairy, green or reddish brown. The five sepals are felty hairy, green or reddish brown in colour, 12–20 mm (0.47–0.79 in) long and 2–6 mm (0.079–0.236 in) wide, narrowly elliptic to elliptic with pointy tips. The five petals are dark pinkish, light pink or rarely white in colour, 15–32 mm (0.59–1.26 in) long and 6–17 mm (0.24–0.67 in) wide. Two larger petals on the upper side of the flower are asymmetric inverted egg-shaped, with dark purple streaks and a reddish purple tinge at the base that dissolves in reddish purple patches. The three lower and smaller petals are narrowly elliptic to inverted egg-shaped, 15–28 mm (0.59–1.10 in) long and 6–12 mm (0.24–0.47 in) wide, and marked reddish purple. The 10 filaments are white to pale pink in colour and merged at base. The filaments differ in length. Mostly 7 (rarely fewer) of them carry 2–3 mm (0.079–0.118 in) long, purple anthers, fixed at the centre that open with a slit towards the centre of the flower, exposing orange pollen. Two are 12–18 mm (0.47–0.71 in), two 10–16 mm (0.39–0.63 in), two 8–13 mm (0.31–0.51 in) and one 11–15 mm (0.43–0.59 in) long. Three (rarely more) are staminodes that lack anthers and are 5–10 mm (0.20–0.39 in) long. The reddish purple style is 6–9 mm (0.24–0.35 in) long, with few long, straight, soft, hairs in the lower half and five dark reddish purple stigmas of 2–4 mm (0.079–0.157 in) long. The fruits each consist of five mericarps of 15–31 mm (0.59–1.22 in) long, with a capsule at base of 4–6 mm (0.16–0.24 in) long and a tail of 11–25 mm (0.43–0.98 in) long. The capsules contain one seed each of 3–4 mm (0.12–0.16 in) long.

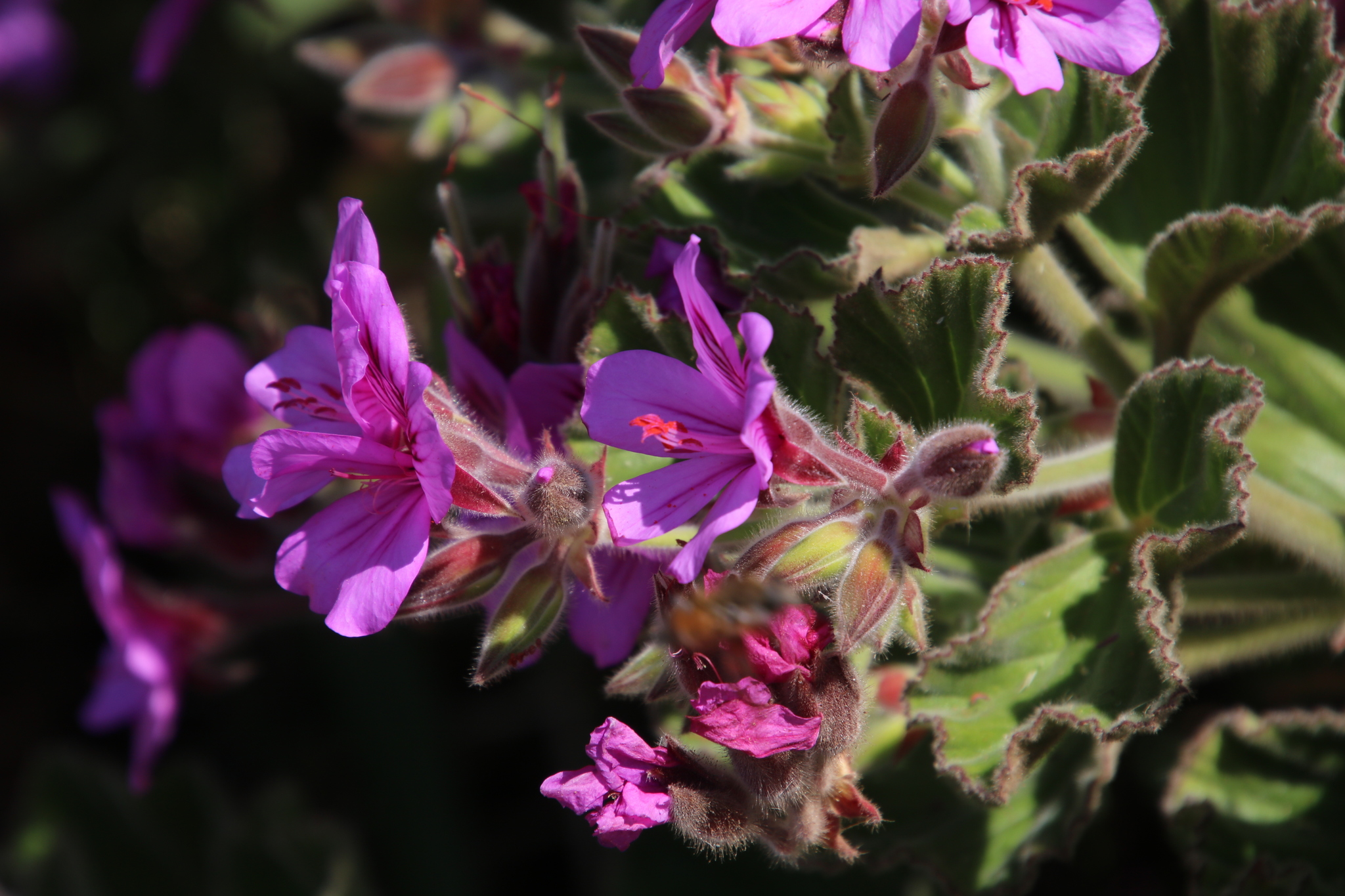
subsp. cucullatum

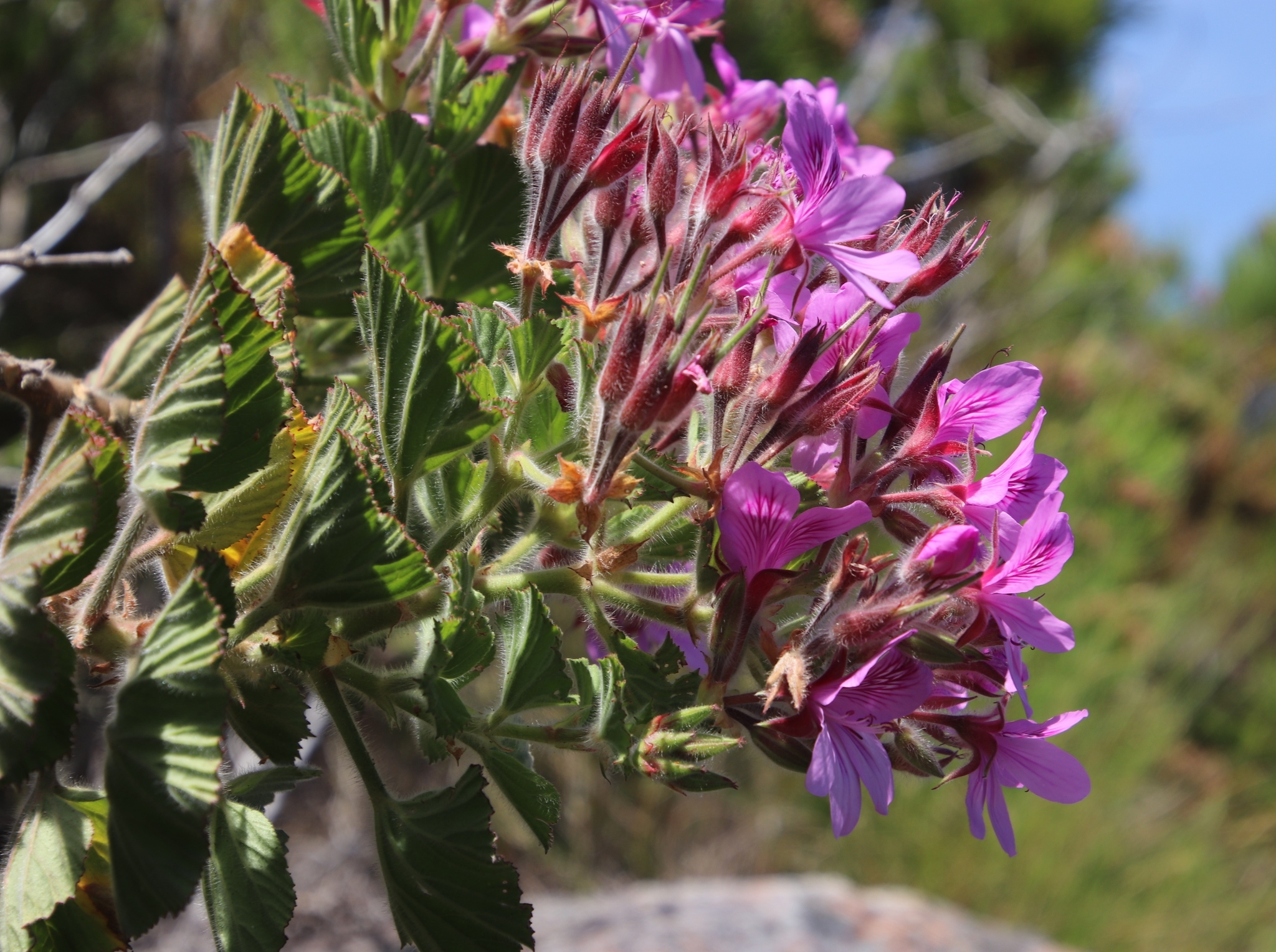
subsp. strigifolium

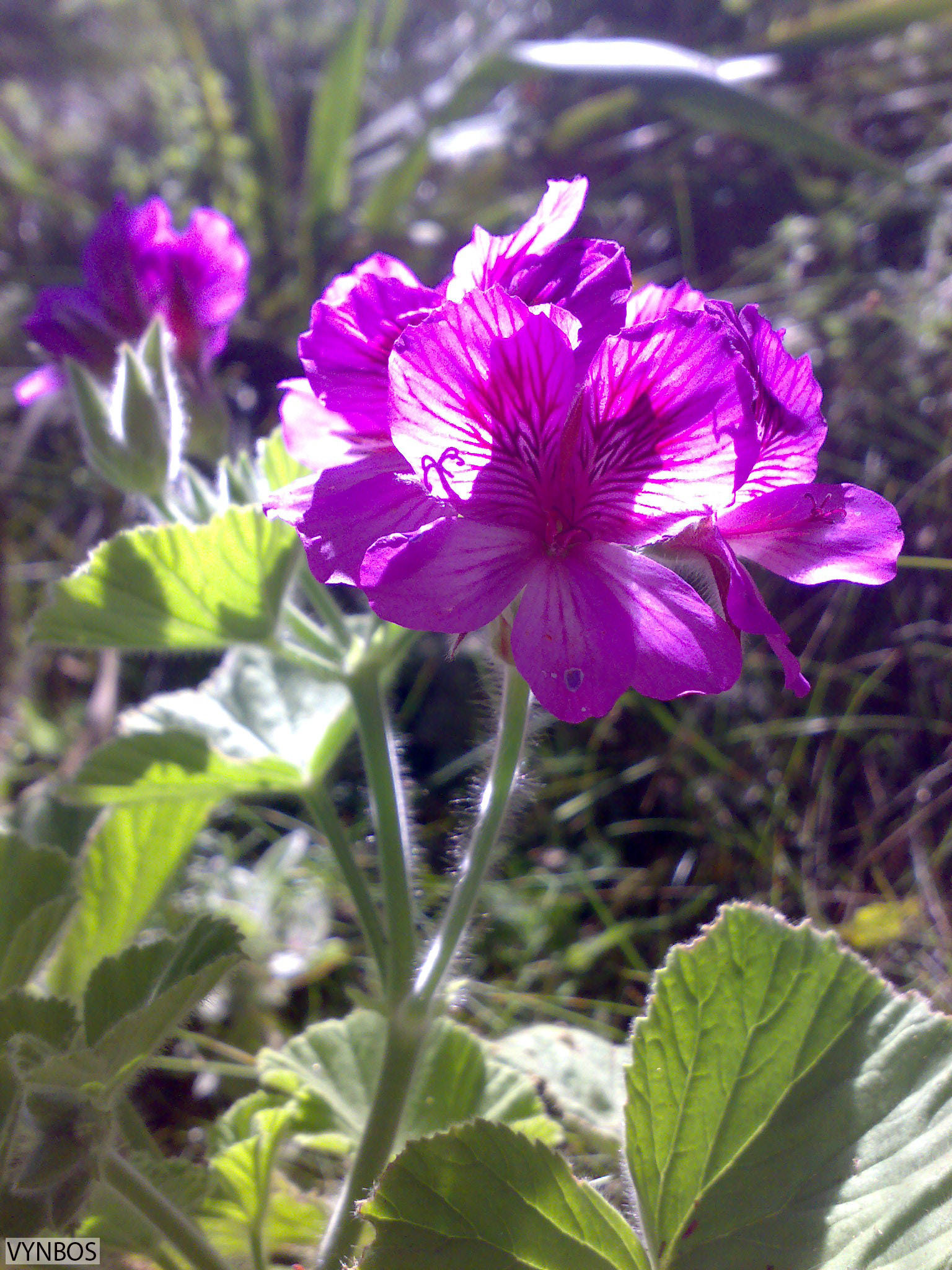
subsp. tabulare

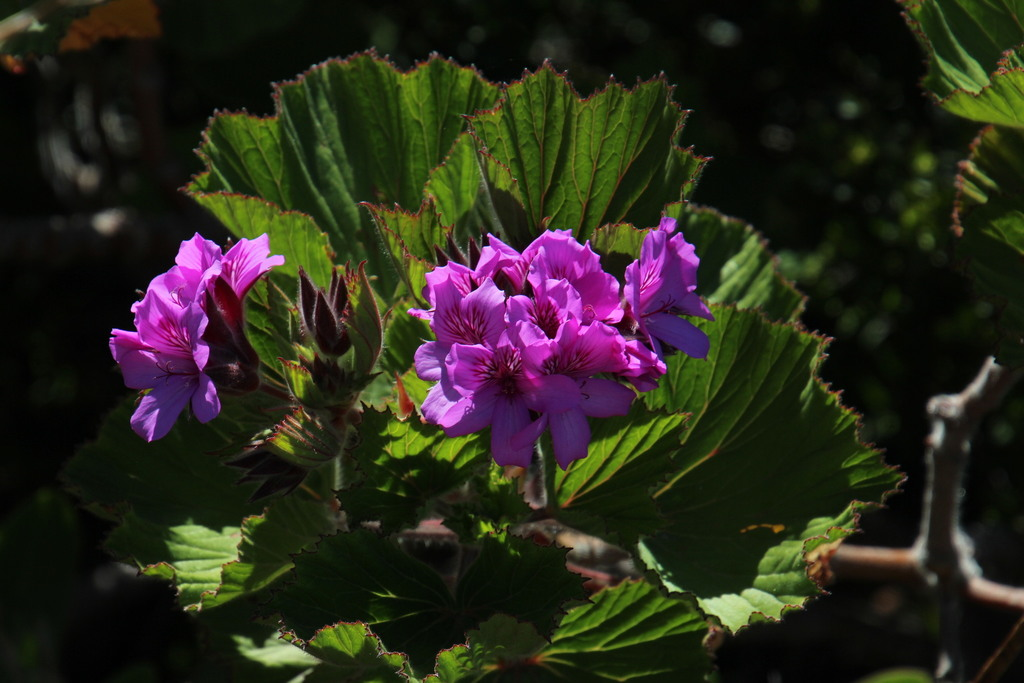

=== Differences between the subspecies ===
Pelargonium cucullatum subsp. cucullatum has somewhat angularly incised leaves, covered in long soft (or villous) hairs. Subsp. strigifolium also has more or less angularly incised leaves, but these are covered in straight hairs that all point in the same direction (or strigose). Finally, the leaves in subsp. tabulare are not angularly incised, and are villously hairy.

== Taxonomy ==
The hooded-leaf pelargonium was first collected for science by Dutch botanist Paul Hermann in 1672, and was probably found on the slopes of Table Mountain. As far as known, William Bentinck, 1st Earl of Portland was the first to grow the species in Europe in 1690. The "father of modern taxonomy", Carl Linnaeus described the species in the Hortus Kewensis, a book by William Aiton that was published in 1789, based on a specimen collected somewhere in Africa, without precise locality, that was illustrated in the Hortus Cliffortianus. Charles Louis L'Héritier de Brutelle assigned it to his genus Pelargonium, creating the new name Pelargonium cucullatum.

Linnaeus had described Geranium cucullatum already in 1753 in the first edition of the Species Plantarum, but it was based on a mix of material of the subspecies cucullatum and strigifolium, making it unfit to base the name of the species or any of these two subspecies on. Charles L'Héritier assigned the mix collection also to Pelargonium cucullatum. In 1891, Otto Kuntze reassigned it again, creating the combination Geraniospermum cucullatum.

In 1759, Nicolaas Laurens Burman distinguished a Geranium cucullatum var. fimbriatum. Phillip Miller, chief gardener at the Chelsea Physic Garden, described Geranium angulosum in the 8th edition of The Gardeners Dictionary in 1768. Charles L'Héritier assigned it to the genus Pelargonium, making the new combination Pelargonium angulosum in the Hortus Kewensis in 1789. In 1891, Otto Kuntze reassigned it again, creating the combination Geraniospermum angulosum. Spanish botanist Antonio José Cavanilles described and illustrated Pelargonium acerifolium in his Monadelphiae Classis Dissertationes Decem. Diss. 4, Quarta Dissertatio Botanica, De Geranio of 1787. Volschenk, Van der Walt & Vorster in their 1982 revision of Pelargonium cucullatum considered all of these names synonymous to subsp. cucullatum.

Charles L'Héritier also distinguished Pelargonium acerifolium in the Hortus Kewensis in 1789. This is not the same plant as Cavanilles had described under the same name two years earlier. William Henry Harvey in 1860 reduced it in 1860 to a variety of L'Héritier's species Pelargonium angulosum. Volschenk, Van der Walt & Vorster renamed it in 1982 to subsp. strigifolium.

Volschenk in the same revision of the species distinguished a new subspecies that he called Pelargonium cucullatum subsp. tabulare.

Pelargonium cucullatum is the type species of the section Pelargonium, the subgenus Pelargonium, and the genus Pelargonium. A recent comparison of homologous DNA resulted in the following relationship tree:

- part of the section Pelargonium
  - - P. graveolens, P. radens, P. vitifolium
    - P. hispidum, P. papilonaceum, P. tomentosum
  - - P. betulinum, P. hermanniifolium, P. laevigatum, P. lanceolatum
    - - P. cucullatum
      - - P. cordifolium
        - P. fruticosum
    - - P. patulum
      - - - P. grandiflorum, P. alpinum, P. sublignosum
          - - P. crispum
            - P. englerianum
        - - P. citronellum
          - - P. scabrum, P. setulosum, P. incarnatum
            - P. ternatum

The name of the species cucullatum is Latin and means "hood", which refers to the cupped leaves.

== Distribution and conservation ==
All three subspecies grow in fynbos vegetation. Subspecies cucullatum occurs on the east coast of the Cape Peninsula and the Kogelberg, growing on sandy and well-drained soil that receives 400–800 mm (16–31 in) precipitation per year. The largest population of subsp. tabulare can be found on the south and west coast, and the inland of the Cape Peninsula, but it also occurs around Saldanha Bay. The subsp. strigifolium, is a montane taxon that can be found from near Caledon in the Kleinrivier Mountains in the east to the Hottentots Holland Mountains in the west, and from Baardskeerdersbos in the south to around Bainskloof in the north. It occurs on a variety of soils derived from sandstone, shale, tillite and granite, always above about 300 m (980 ft) altitude, receiving 600–1,000 mm (24–39 in) precipitation annually. The populations of all three subspecies of Pelargonium cucullatum in the wild are stable and their continued survival is considered to be of least concern.
