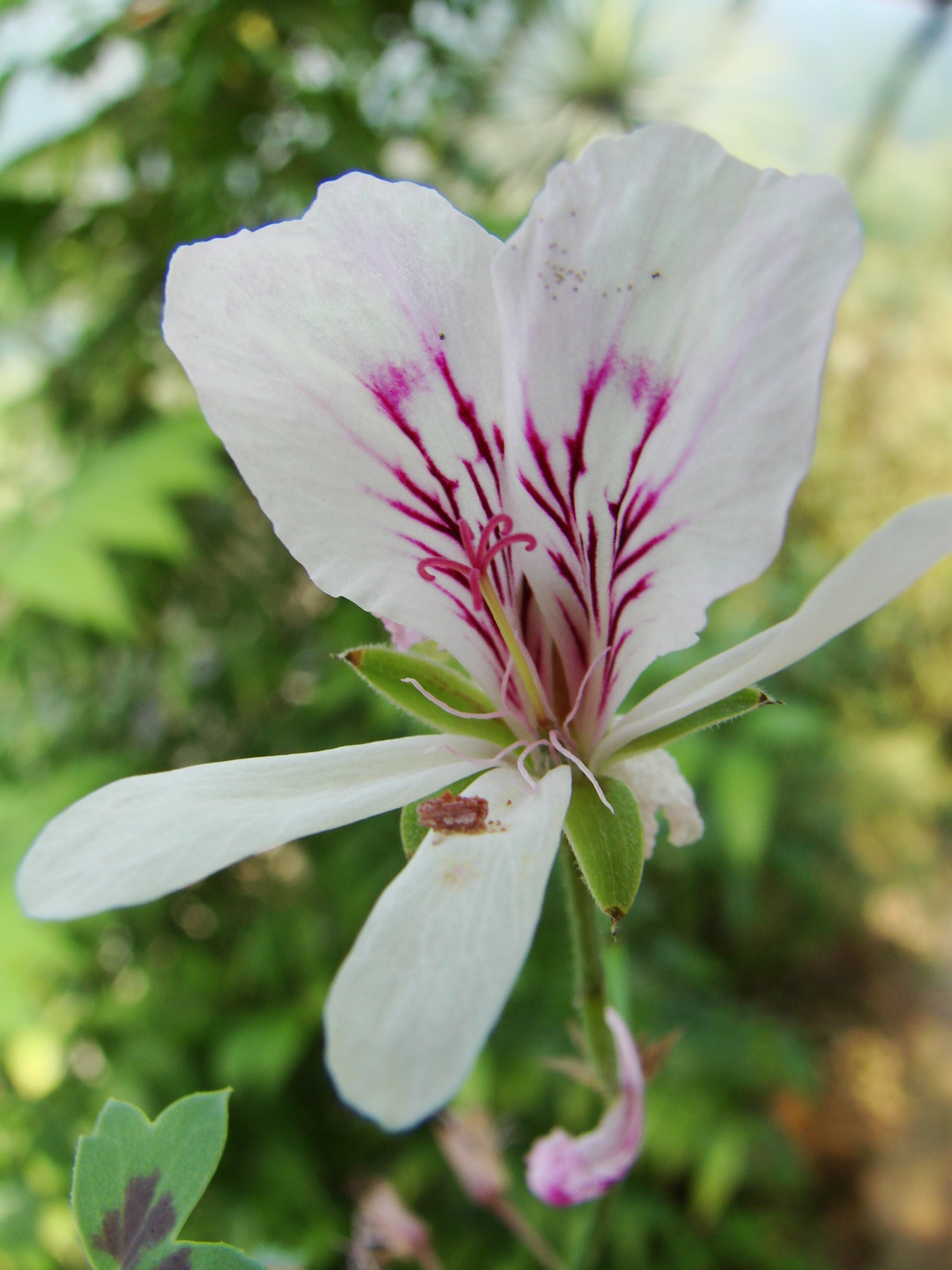
- Close-up of flower
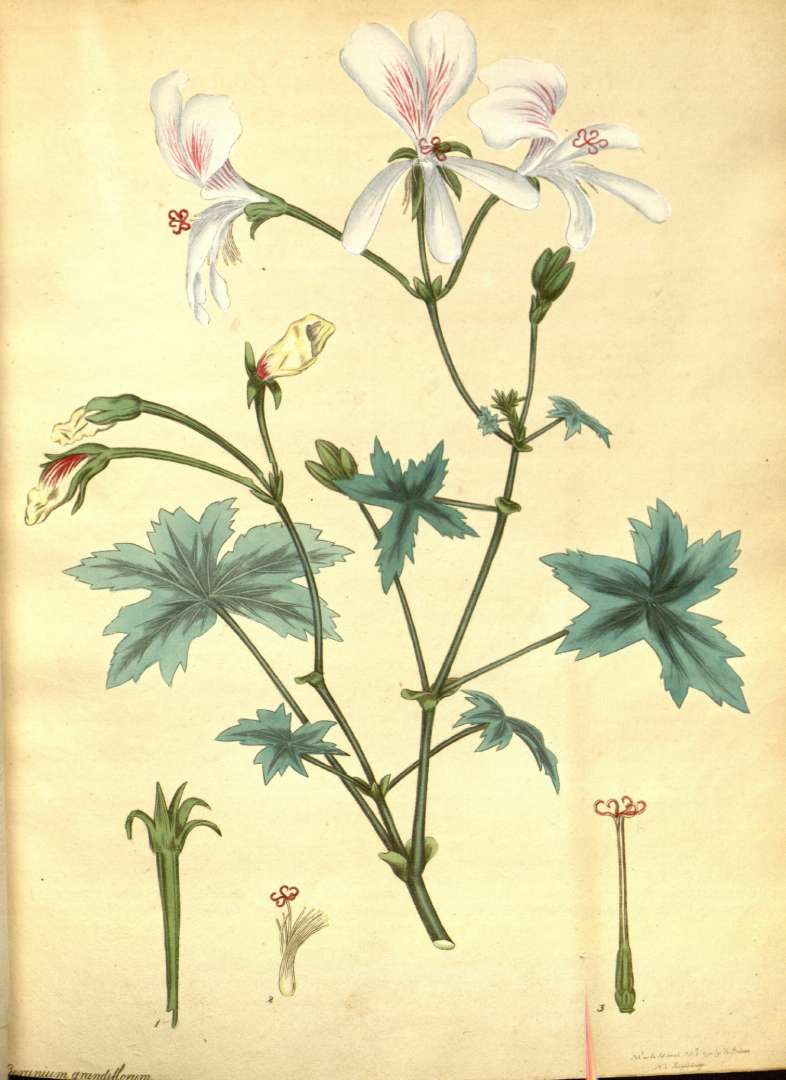
- Botanical illustration

Scientific classification
- Kingdom: Plantae
- Clade: Tracheophytes
- Clade: Angiosperms
- Clade: Eudicots
- Clade: Rosids
- Order: Geraniales
- Family: Geraniaceae
- Genus: Pelargonium
- Species: P. grandiflorum

Binomial name
- Pelargonium grandiflorum Willd.

Synonyms
- Eumorpha grandiflora (Willd.) Eckl. & Zeyh.; Geraniospermum grandiflorum (Willd.) Kuntze; Geraniospermum variegatum (L.f.) Kuntze; Geranium glabrum Dum.Cours.; Geranium grandiflorum Andrews; Geranium × hepaticifolium Andrews

= Pelargonium grandiflorum =

Species of plant

Pelargonium grandiflorum is a species of flowering plant in the family Geraniaceae, native to the southwestern Cape Provinces of South Africa. It may be a parent of the cultivated Pelargonium × domesticum (regal pelargonium) with Pelargonium cucullatum.
