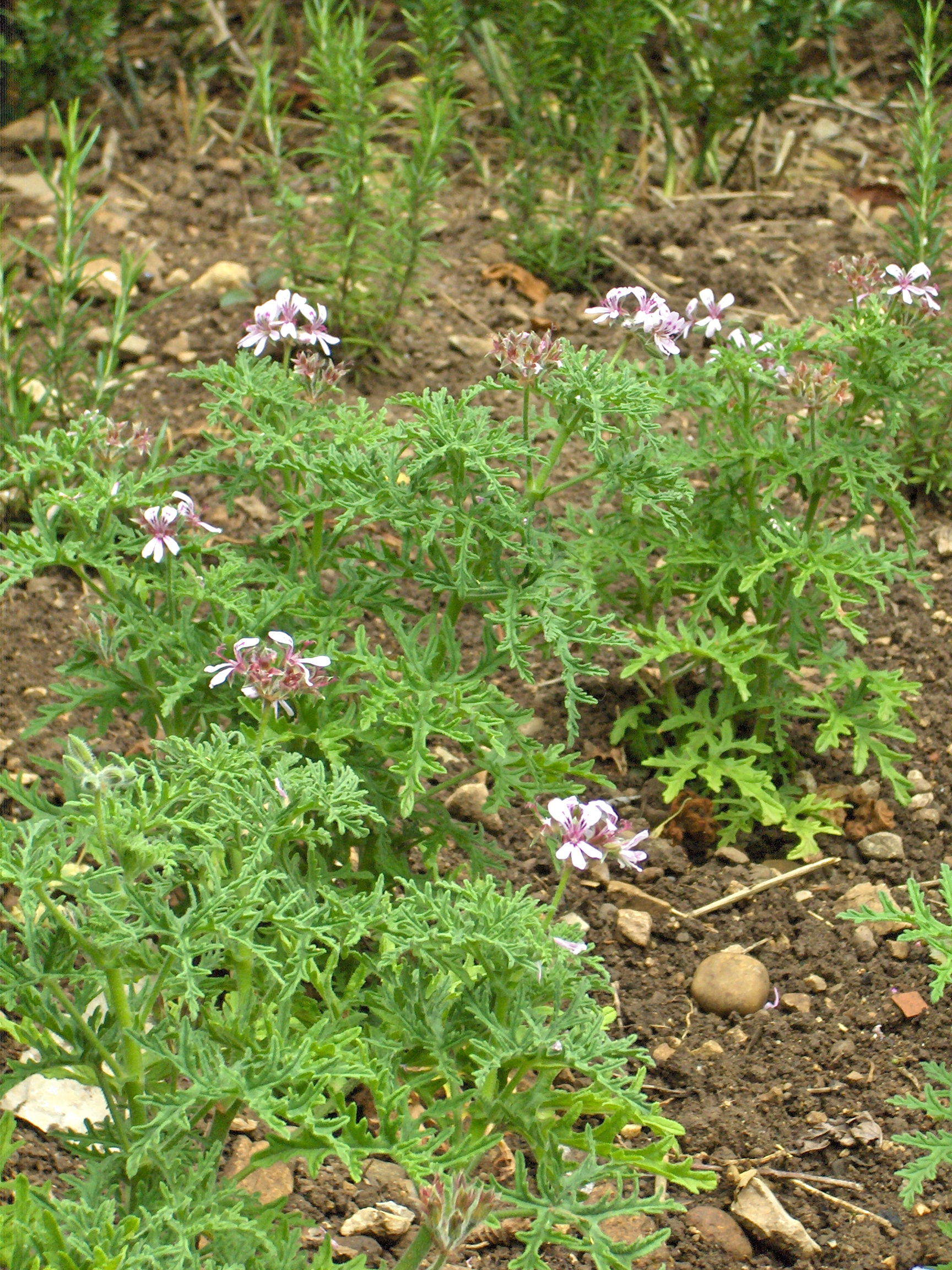

Scientific classification
- Kingdom: Plantae
- Clade: Tracheophytes
- Clade: Angiosperms
- Clade: Eudicots
- Clade: Rosids
- Order: Geraniales
- Family: Geraniaceae
- Genus: Pelargonium
- Species: P. radens

Binomial name
- Pelargonium radens H.E.Moore

Synonyms
- Homotypic Synonyms: Anisopetala radula Walp.; Geraniospermum radula Kuntze; Geraniospermum revolutum (Jacq.) Kuntze; Geranium radula Cav.; Geranium revolutum Jacq.; Pelargonion radulum St.-Lag.; Pelargonium radula L'Hér.; Heterotypic Synonyms: Geraniospermum roseum Kuntze; Geranium asperifolium Andrews; Pelargonium asperifolium (Andrews) Sweet; Pelargonium radula var. roseum Willd.; Pelargonium raduloides Hoffmanns. ex F.Dietr.; Pelargonium roseum Willd.; Pelargonium rosodorum Hoffmanns.

= Pelargonium radens =

Species of flowering plant

Pelargonium radens is a species of flowering plant in the family Geraniaceae. It is sometimes referred to by the common name rasp-leaf pelargonium. It is in the subgenus Pelargonium along with Pelargonium crispum and Pelargonium tomentosum.

== Description ==
Pelargonium radens is an evergreen perennial plant, growing to up to 1.5 m (4 ft 11 in) high. It has deeply cut triangular scented gray-green leaves and in the summer bears clusters of small pink-purple flowers, followed by small curly-tailed brownish seeds. It is originally from the southern and eastern Cape, South Africa, where it grows in ravines or gorges near streams or among shrubs on mountainsides.

== Etymology ==
Pelargonium comes from the Greek πελαργός pelargos, which means stork. Another name for pelargoniums is stork's-bills due to the shape of their fruit. Radens refers to the coarse, rasp leaves.

== Cultivars and hybrids ==
There are a few cultivars and hybrids of Pelargonium radens. These include:

- Pelargonium 'Lara Candy Dancer' - A rose scented variety. The flowers are less marked than the species. AGM
- Pelargonium 'Crowfoot' - A minty rose scented variety.
- Pelargonium 'Dr Livingstone' (Synonym - 'Skeleton Rose') - A rose scented variety with less dissected leaves that the species.
- Pelargonium 'Radula' - A rose scented variety. Often thought of as a synonym of the species or a named clone.
- Pelargonium 'Red Flowered Rose' - A reddish-pink flowered variety that could be a hybrid between one of the other rose scented species.
- Pelargonium 'Graveolens' (Synonym - P. × asperum) - A rose scented hybrid between Pelargonium capitatum and P. radens. This hybrid is the most commonly used pelargonium in the perfume industry.

== Uses ==
Traditionally the edible leaves were used as a flavoring in jellies and in herbal teas. Geranium oil, an essential oil extracted from the leaves and flowers, is used commercially as a food flavoring and additive. This essential oil is classified as Generally Recognized as Safe by the US FDA when small quantities are added to foods.

Pelargonium radens is used as a house plant. It is also cultivated as an ornamental in, e.g., North America, in USDA hardiness zones 10–11. Propagation is by seeds and stem cuttings.
