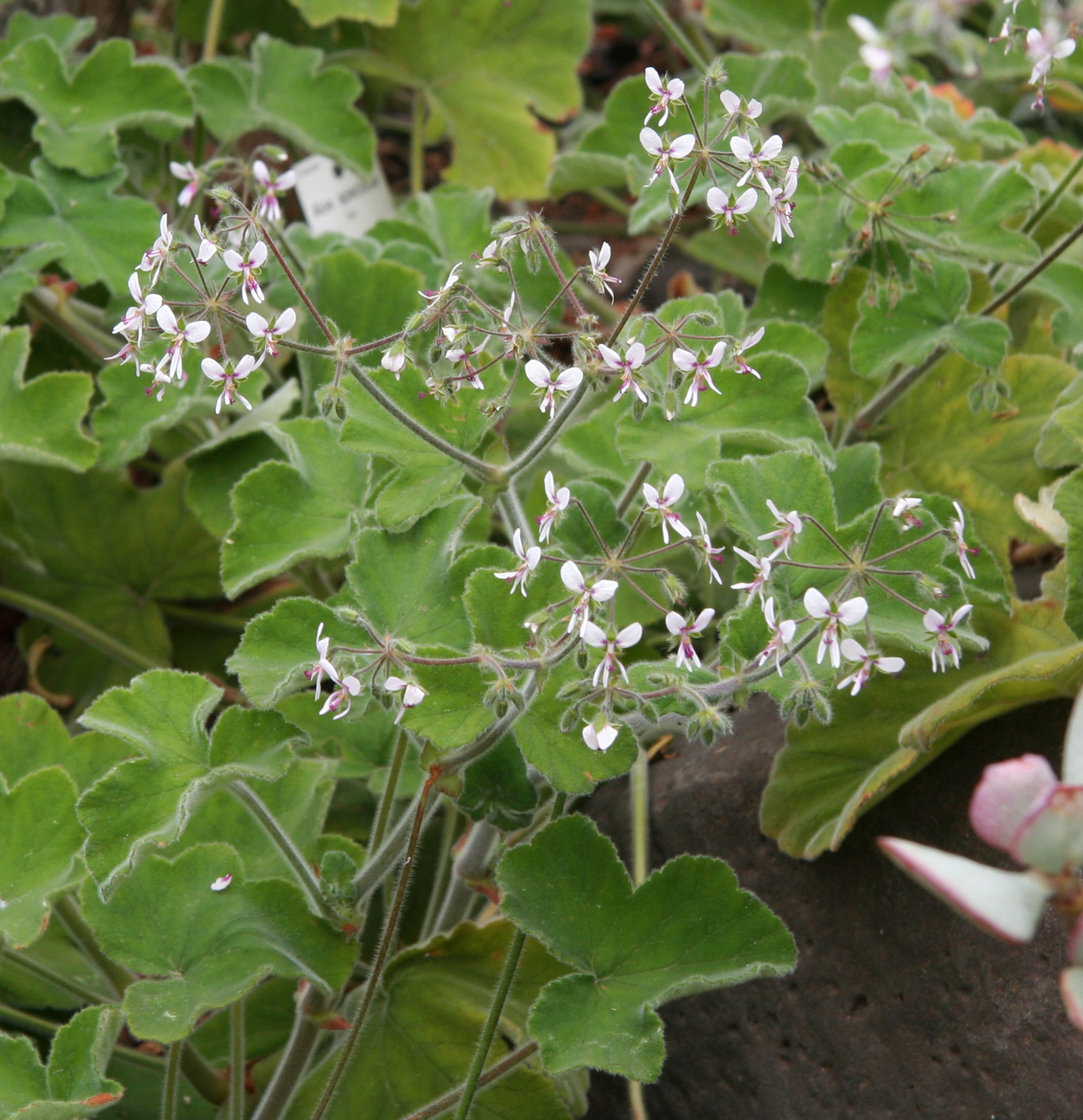

Scientific classification
- Kingdom: Plantae
- Clade: Tracheophytes
- Clade: Angiosperms
- Clade: Eudicots
- Clade: Rosids
- Order: Geraniales
- Family: Geraniaceae
- Genus: Pelargonium
- Species: P. tomentosum

Binomial name
- Pelargonium tomentosum Jacq.

= Pelargonium tomentosum =

Species of flowering plant

Pelargonium tomentosum, the peppermint-scented geranium, is a pelargonium species native to South Africa. It is in the subgenus Pelargonium along with Pelargonium graveolens, Pelargonium crispum and Pelargonium capitatum.

== Etymology ==
Pelargonium comes from the Greek; Pelargos which means stork. Another name for pelargoniums is storksbills due to the shape of their fruit. Tomentosum refers to the soft, furry, tomentose leaves.

== Description ==
Pelargonium tomentosum is a tall, spreading species which grows up to a metre wide and a metre high. It is a very soft, hairy plant with a strong mint scent (due to the menthone in the leaves) and small white flowers. The leaves are green-grey in colour with a wide, three-lobed shape.

== Cultivars and hybrids ==
There are only a few cultivars and hybrids of Pelargonium tomentosum. These cultivars and hybrids include:

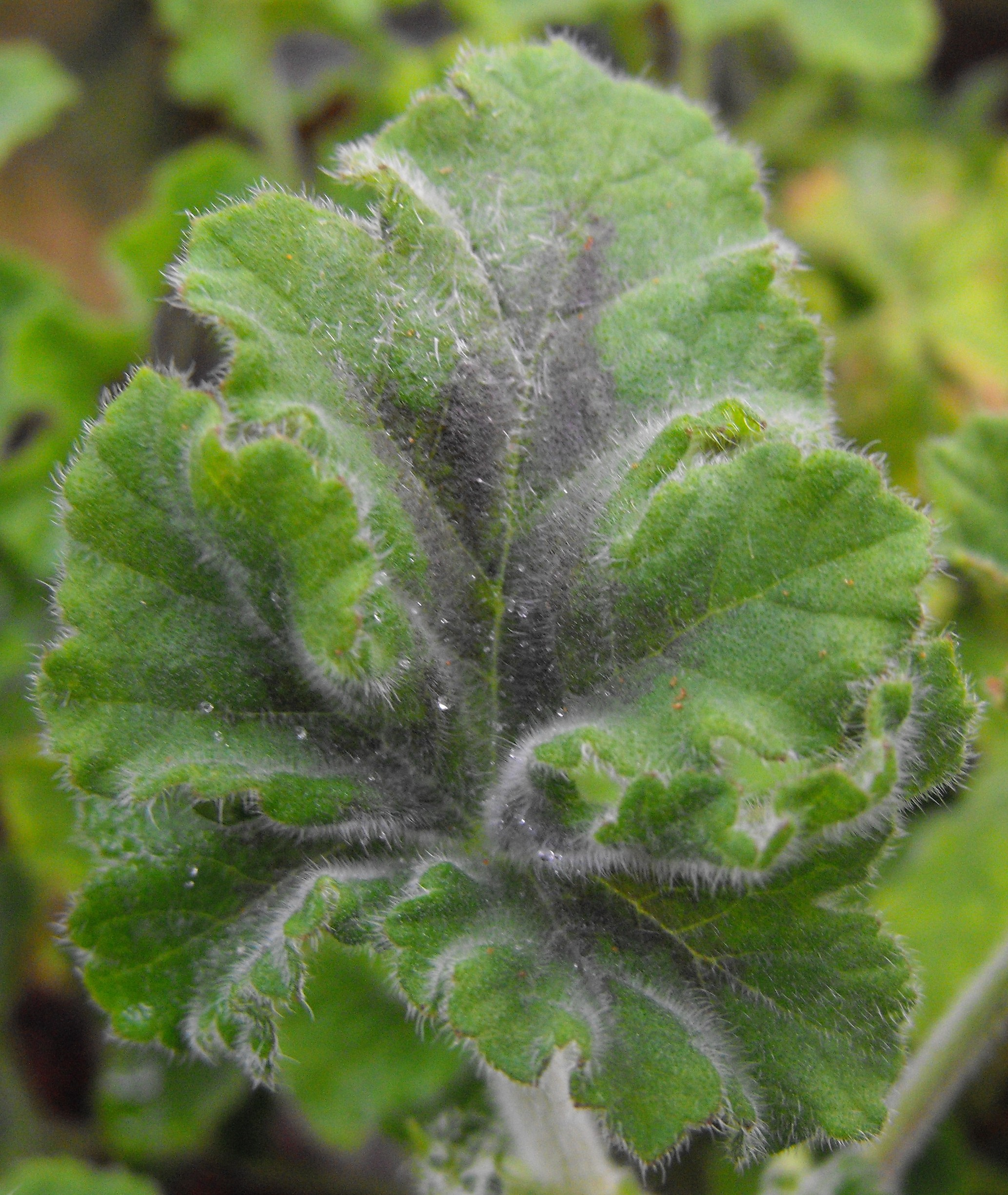
Pelargonium tomentosum 'Chocolate Peppermint'

- Pelargonium tomentosum 'Chocolate Peppermint' - A hybrid between P. tomentosum and Pelargonium 'Giant Oak' (A cultivar of Pelargonium quercifolium). P. Chocolate Peppermint is a tall species that spreads like P. tomentosum. It smells slightly of mint but the 'chocolate' refers to the brown blotches in the centre of the leaves which it gets from P. 'Giant Oak'.
- Pelargonium 'Islington Peppermint' - A hybrid between P. tomentosum and Pelargonium 'Splendide'. A smaller pelargonium with fresh mint scented leaves and striking bicolour flowers of white and brown. It is an unusual hybrid because P. tomentosum is in the subgenus Pelargonium but P. 'Splendide' is a hybrid between Pelargonium ovale and Pelargonium tricolor which are both in the subgenus Camphylia.

== Uses ==
As well as being a houseplant or outdoor perennial depending on climate, Pelargonium tomentosum has a few other uses. Firstly, the leaves are edible and are great as a flavouring for cakes or tea. The leaves are not usually eaten due to the hairiness of the leaves being somewhat repulsive. Secondly, due to the astringent characteristics of the oils in its leaves, a poultice can be made to treat sprains or bruises. It is also works like mint for treating sore throats if the menthol is obtained correctly. Thirdly the leaves are very aromatic and can be used in potpourri.
