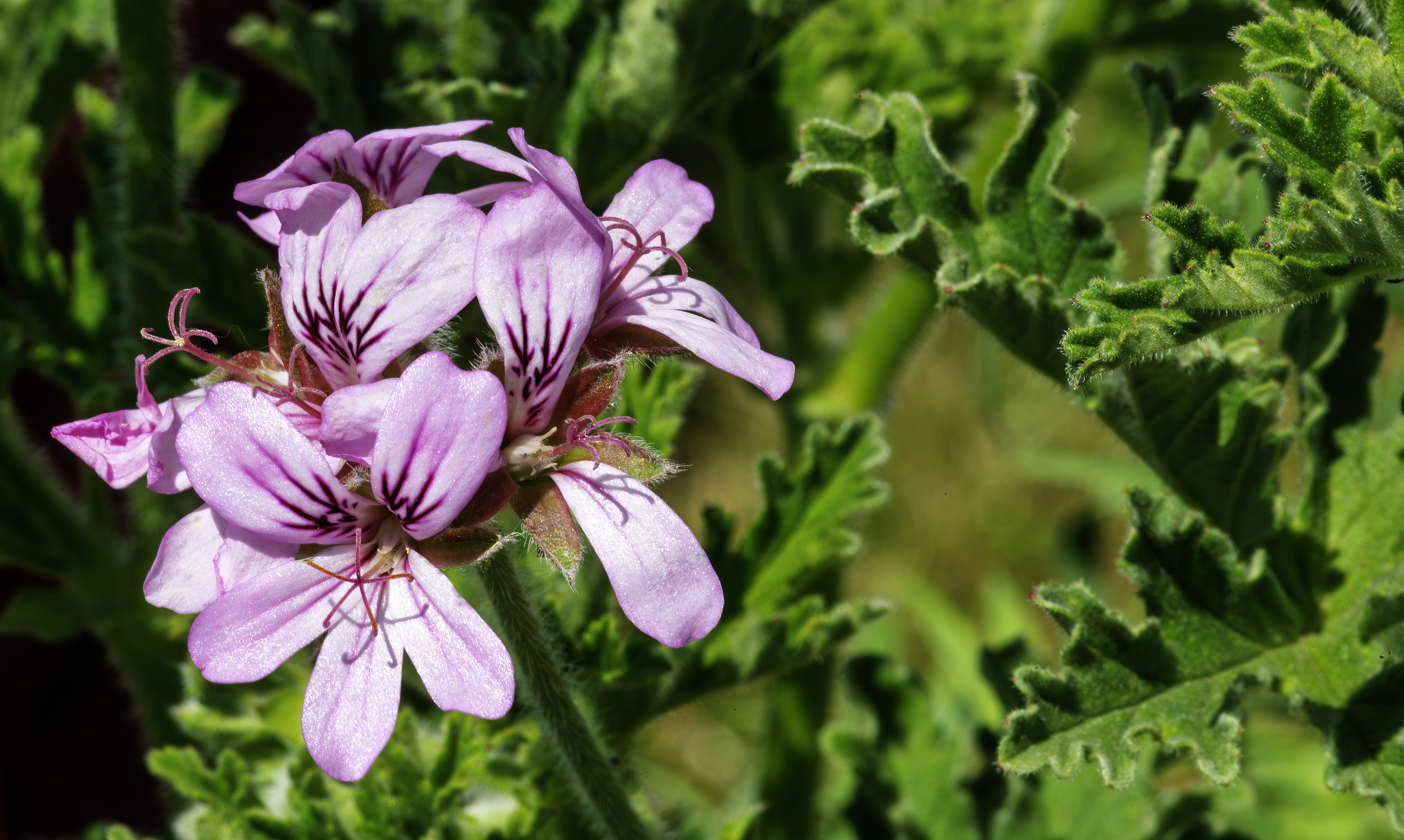

Scientific classification
- Kingdom: Plantae
- Clade: Tracheophytes
- Clade: Angiosperms
- Clade: Eudicots
- Clade: Rosids
- Order: Geraniales
- Family: Geraniaceae
- Genus: Pelargonium
- Species: P. graveolens

Binomial name
- Pelargonium graveolens L'Hér.

= Pelargonium graveolens =

Species of plant

Pelargonium graveolens is a Pelargonium species native to the Cape Provinces and the Northern Provinces of South Africa, Zimbabwe and Mozambique. Common names include rose geranium, sweet scented geranium, old-fashioned rose geranium, and rose-scent geranium.

== Description ==
Pelargonium graveolens is an erect, aromatic, multi-branched subshrub, that grows up to 1.5 m and has a spread of 1 m. The leaves are deeply incised, velvety and soft to the touch (due to glandular hairs). The above-ground parts of the plant are more or less hairy and glandular. The alternately arranged leaves are divided into petioles and leaf blades. The leaf blade is soft, heart-shaped and palmately divided, blunt with lobed to coarsely toothed leaf lobes. The natural form smells of mint. Some cultivars have a scent similar to rose petals, although the leaf shape and scent vary (others have little or no scent). Some leaves are deeply incised and others less so, being slightly lobed like P. capitatum. The flowers vary from pale pink to almost white which appear from late winter to summer, peaking in spring.

== Etymology ==
Pelargonium comes from the Greek πελαργός pelargos which means stork. Another name for pelargoniums is stork's-bills due to the shape of their fruit. The specific epithet graveolens refers to the strong-smelling leaves.

=== Common names ===
Pelargonium graveolens is also known by taxonomic synonyms Geranium terebinthinaceum Cav. and Pelargonium terebinthinaceum (Cav.) Desf. "Rose geranium" is sometimes used to refer to Pelargonium incrassatum (Andrews) Sims or its synonym Pelargonium roseum (Andrews) DC. – the herbal name. Commercial vendors often list the source of geranium or rose geranium essential oil as Pelargonium graveolens, regardless of its botanical name.

== Distribution ==
It is native to Mozambique and Zimbabwe in southern, tropical Africa, and South Africa (Cape Province, Transvaal). Pelargoniums have been cultivated in South Africa and Namibia for at least 200 years. The plant is also found in the Canary Islands, Corsica, Costa Rica, Cuba, the Dominican Republic, Haiti, southwestern Mexico, and Puerto Rico, where it has been introduced.

== Cultivars and hybrids ==
Many plants are cultivated under the species name "Pelargonium graveolens" but differ from wild specimens as they are of hybrid origin (probably a cross between P. graveolens, P. capitatum and/or P. radens). There are many cultivars and they have a wide variety of scents, including rose, citrus, mint and cinnamon as well as various fruits. Cultivars and hybrids include:

- P. 'Graveolens' (or Pelargonium graveolens hort.) - A rose-scented cultivar; possibly a hybrid between P. graveolens and P. radens or P. capitatum. This cultivar is often incorrectly labeled as Pelargonium graveolens (the species). The main difference between the species and this cultivar is the dissection of the leaf. The species' has about 5 lobes but the cultivar has about 10.
- P. 'Citrosum' - A lemony, citronella-scented cultivar, similar to P. 'Graveolens'. It is meant to repel mosquitos and rumour has it that it was made by genetically bonding genes from the citronella grass but this is highly unlikely.
- P. 'Cinnamon Rose' - A cinnamon-scented cultivar.
- P. 'Dr Westerlund' - A lemony rose-scented cultivar, similar to P. 'Graveolens'.
- P. 'Graveolens Bontrosai' - A genetically challenged form; the leaves are smaller and curl back on themselves and the flowers often do not open fully. Known as P. 'Colocho' in the US.
- P. 'Grey Lady Plymouth' - A lemony rose-scented cultivar similar to P. 'Lady Plymouth'. The leaves are grey–green in colour.
- P. 'Lady Plymouth' - A minty lemony rose-scented cultivar. A very popular variety with a definite mint scent. Possibly a P. radens hybrid.
- P. 'Lara Starshine' - A lemony rose-scented cultivar, similar to P. 'Graveolens' but with more lemony scented leaves and reddish pink flowers. Bred by Australian plantsman Cliff Blackman.
- P. 'Lucaeflora' - A rose-scented variety, much more similar to the species than most other cultivars and varieties.
- P. × melissinum - The lemon balm pelargonium (lemon balm - Melissa officinalis). This is a hybrid between P. crispum and P. graveolens.
- P. 'Mint Rose' - A minty rose-scented cultivar similar to P. 'Lady Plymouth' but without the variegation of the leaves and lemony undertones.
- P. 'Secret Love' - An unusual eucalyptus-scented cultivar with pale pink flowers.
- P. 'Van Leeni' - A lemony rose-scented cultivar, similar to P. 'Graveolens' and P. 'Dr Westerlund'.

Others known: Camphor Rose, Capri, Granelous and Little Gem.

== Uses ==
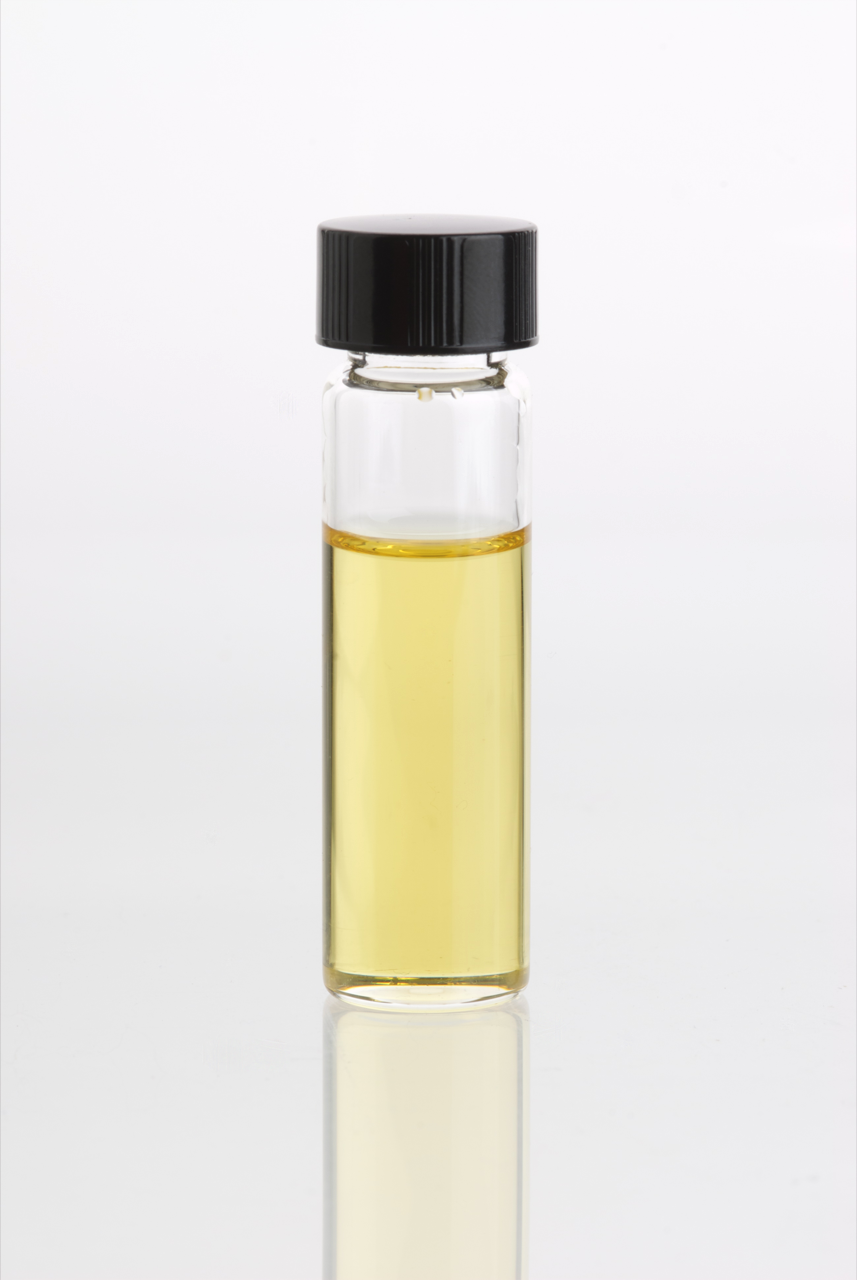
Geranium (Pelargonium 'Graveolens') essential oil in a clear glass vial

Both the true species and the cultivated plant may be called rose geranium – pelargoniums are often called geraniums, as they fall within the plant family Geraniaceae, and were previously classified in the same genus. The common P. 'Graveolens' or P. 'Rosat' has great importance in the perfume industry. It is cultivated on a large scale and its foliage is distilled for its scent. Pelargonium distillates and absolutes, commonly known as "geranium oil", are sold for aromatherapy and massage therapy applications. They are also sometimes used to supplement or adulterate more expensive rose oils. As a flavoring, the flowers and leaves are used in cakes, jams, jellies, ice creams, sorbets, salads, sugars, and teas. In addition, it is used as a flavoring agent in some pipe tobaccos, being one of the characteristic "Lakeland scents."

Rose geranium, known as Mâatercha or Ätarcha in Morocco, is used as a flavorful herb to complement spearmint tea. It is often added alongside spearmint or other minty herbs to enhance the overall flavor profile of the tea, adding a floral and aromatic note to the brew.

In Cyprus, where it is known as kiouli, it is widely used to flavour desserts and to scent syrups. Notable examples include a variety of spoon sweets (especially grape and apricot spoon sweets), traditional hawthorn jelly spread (marmelada mosfilo), grape must pudding (pallouzes) and to flavour syrups used to soak cake, especially semolina cake.

=== Chemical constituents ===
A modern analysis listed the presence of over 50 organic compounds in the essential oil of P. graveolens from an Australian source. Analyses of Indian geranium oils indicated a similar phytochemical profile, and showed that the major constituents (in terms of % composition) were citronellol + nerol and geraniol.

== Gallery ==
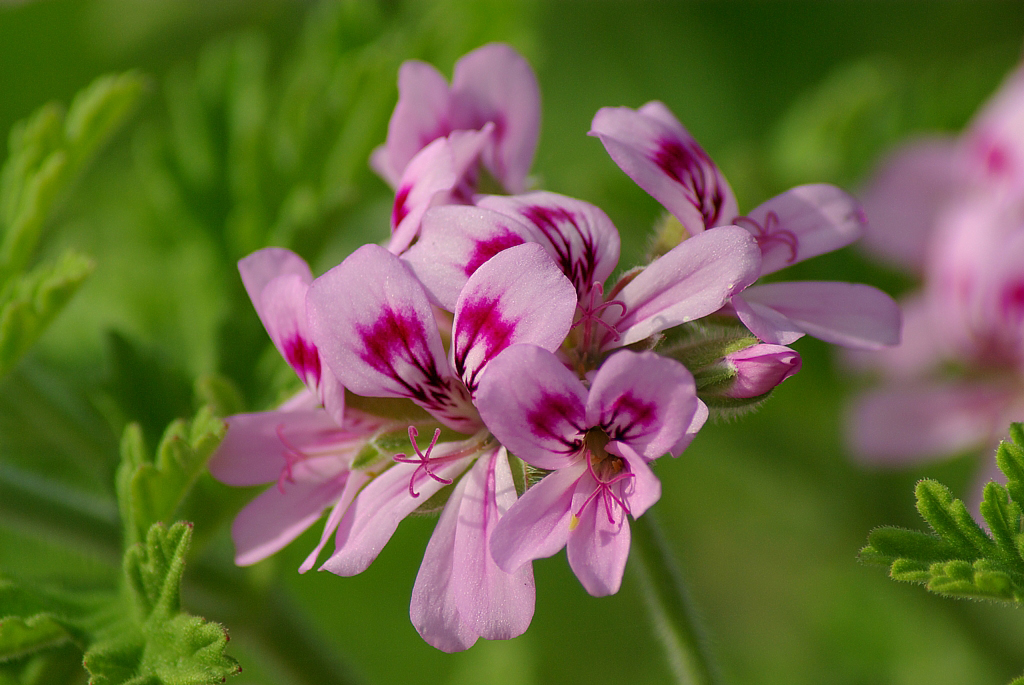
The flower cluster of cultivated P. 'Graveolens'

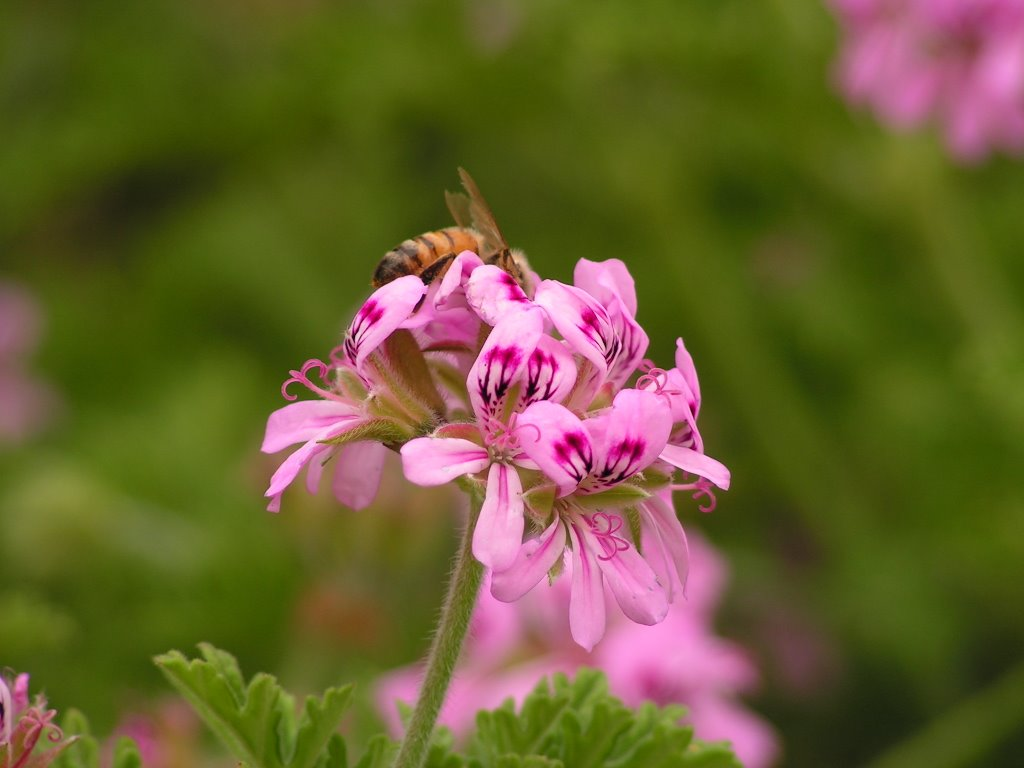
A bee on a flower cluster of cultivated P. 'Graveolens'

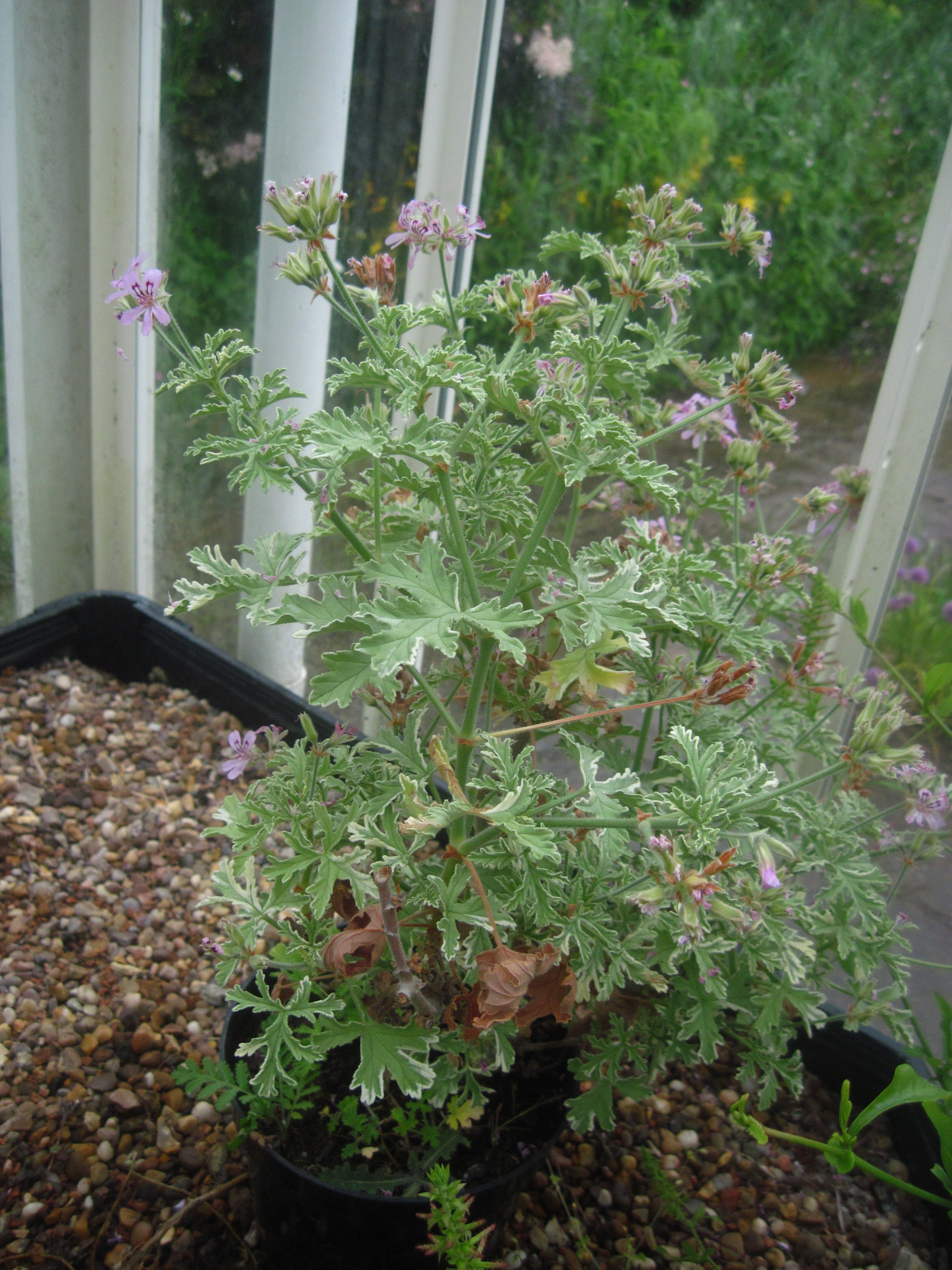
At Ryton Organic Gardens, near Rugby, Warwickshire.

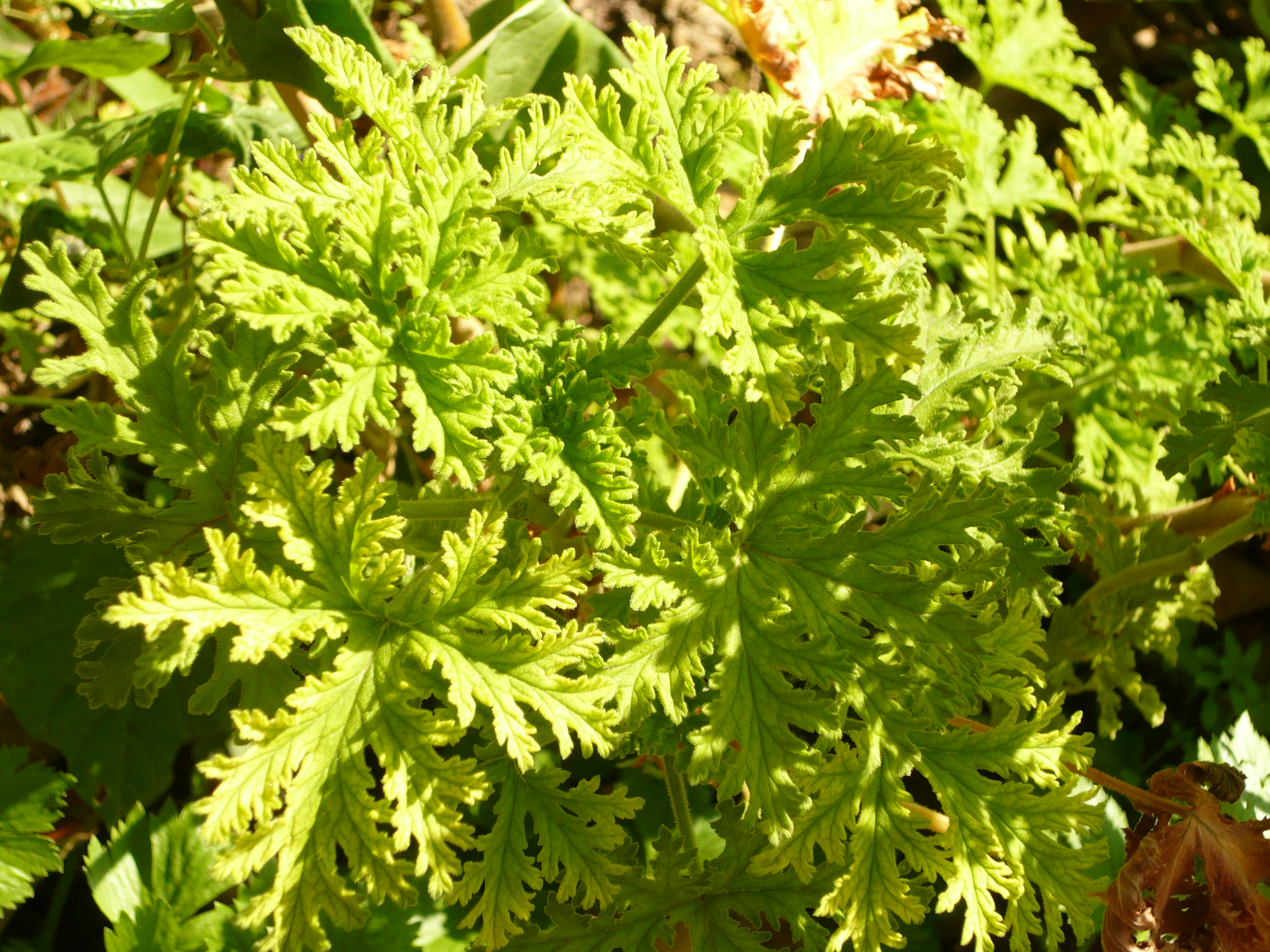
Pelargonium 'Graveolens' leaf

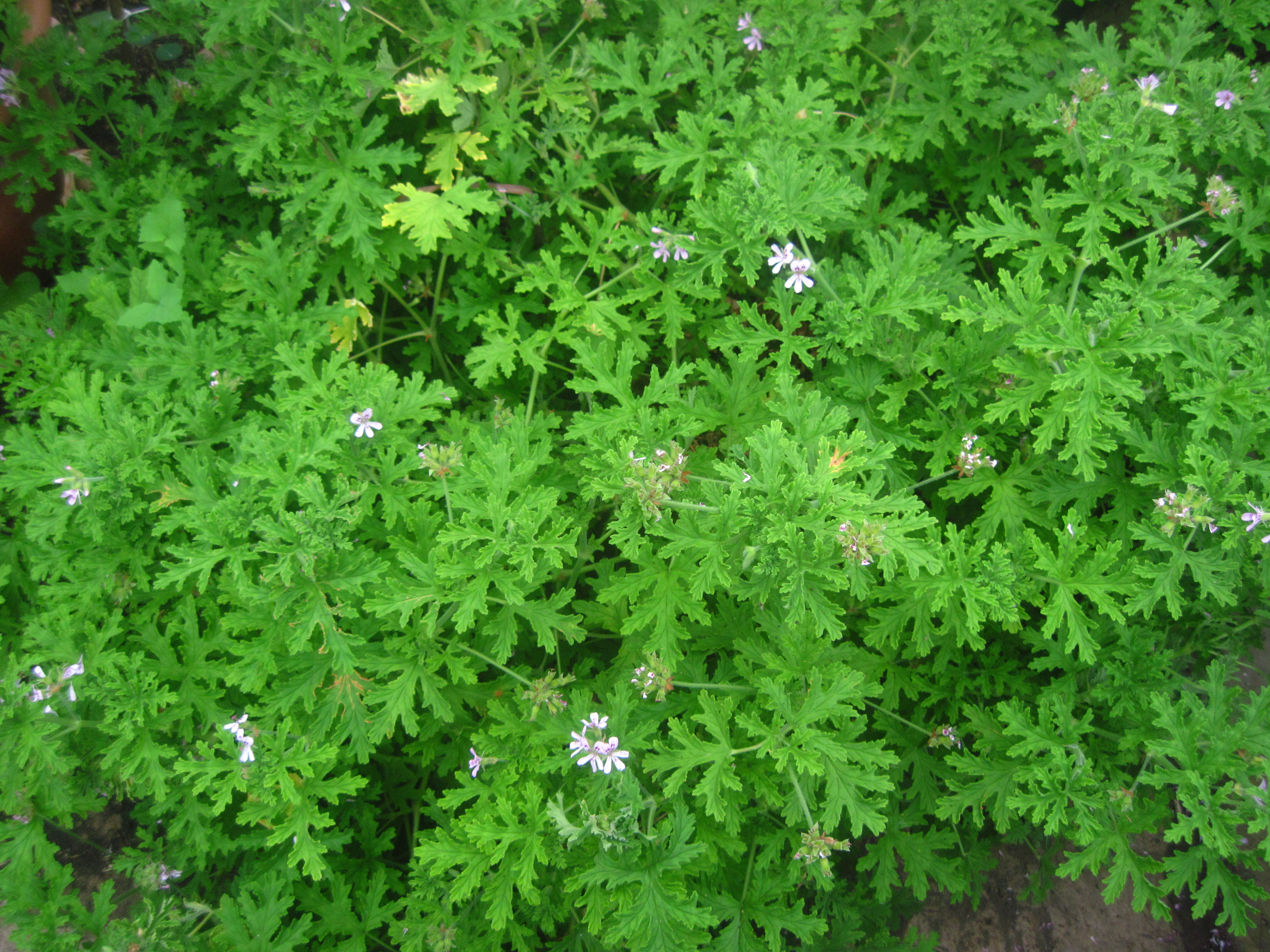
An adult Pelargonium 'Mint Rose' at Ryton Organic Gardens, near Rugby, Warwickshire
