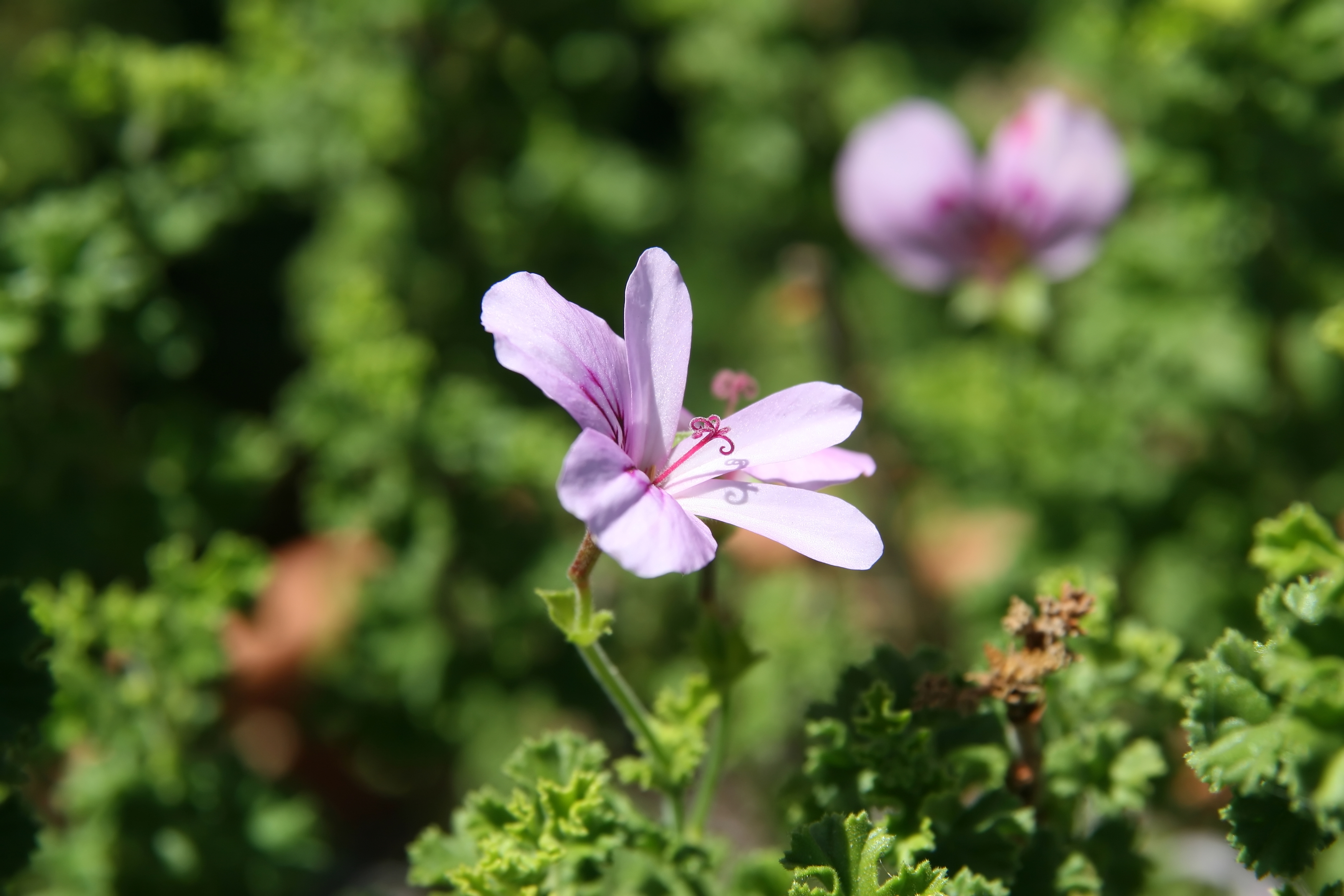
- Pelargonium crispum, detail of flower

Scientific classification
- Kingdom: Plantae
- Clade: Tracheophytes
- Clade: Angiosperms
- Clade: Eudicots
- Clade: Rosids
- Order: Geraniales
- Family: Geraniaceae
- Genus: Pelargonium
- Species: P. crispum

Binomial name
- Pelargonium crispum (P.J.Bergius) L'Hér.

= Pelargonium crispum =

Species of flowering plant

Pelargonium crispum (the "crisped-leaf pelargonium") is a Pelargonium species native to the Western Cape Province, South Africa. It is in the subgenus Pelargonium along with Pelargonium graveolens and Pelargonium capitatum and Pelargonium tomentosum.

== Description ==
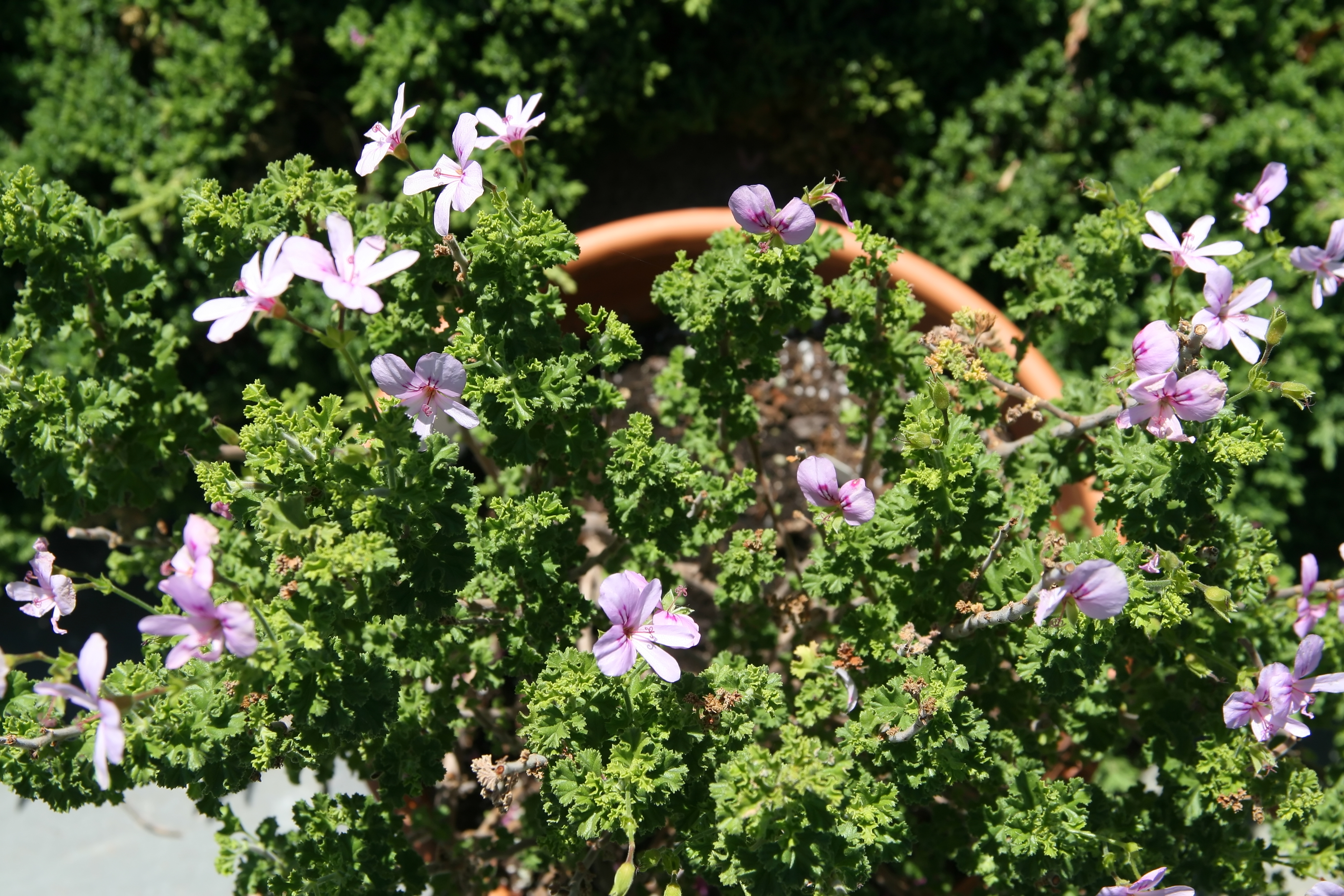
Pelargonium crispum in cultivation.

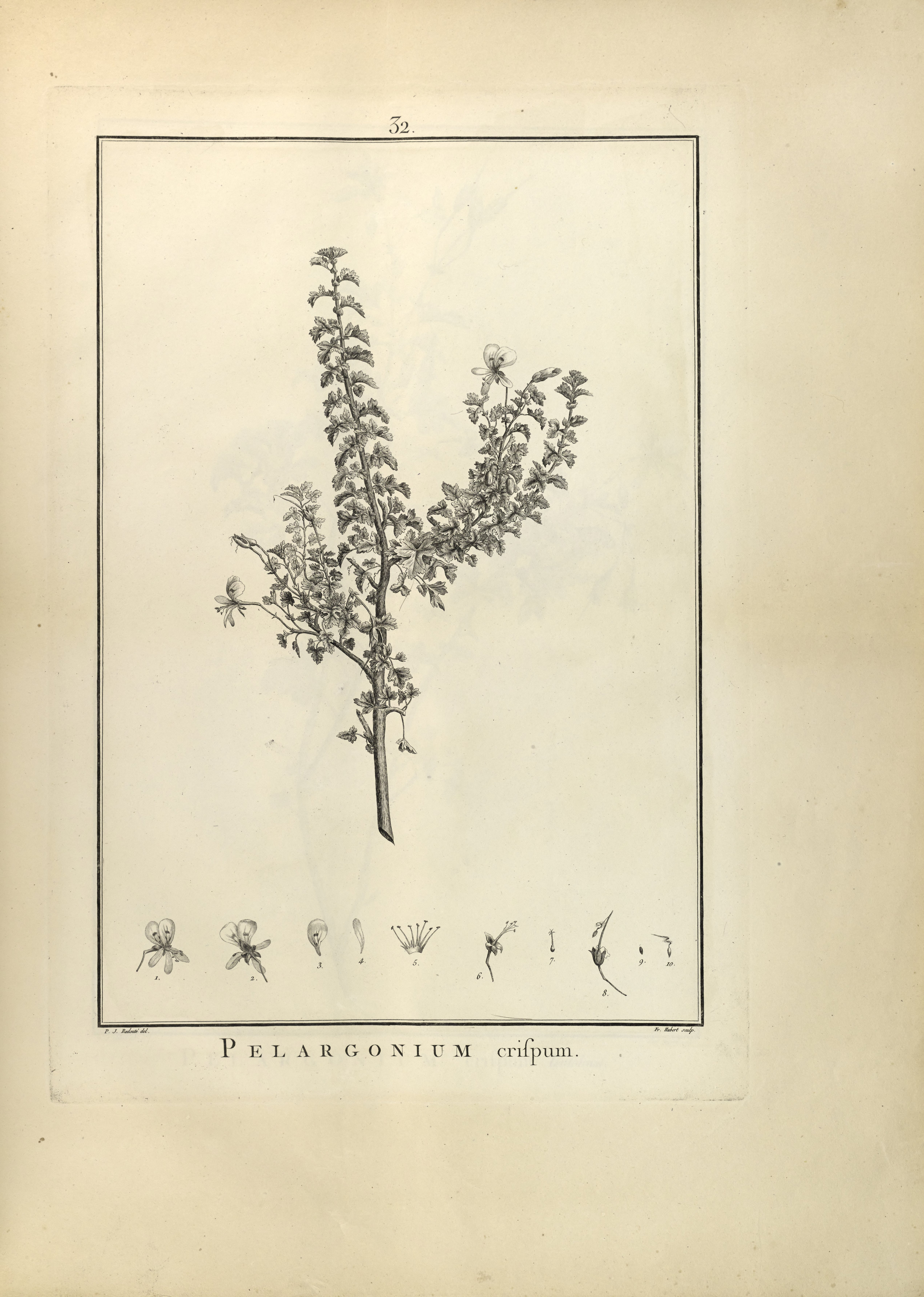
Botanical illustration of Pelargonium crispum, showing the small, crisped leaves arranged in two opposite rows along the stems.

Pelargonium crispum is quite a large, shrubby, branching species, growing up to 70 cm tall. The leaves are usually arranged along the stems in two opposite rows (distichous arrangement).

The leaves are small (10mm diameter), green, lemon-scented, fan-shaped, and have distinctively crisped (crinkled or wavy) edges.

The small (25 x 5-8mm), white-to-pink flowers appear in Spring to Summer, in small groups or alone, on short pedicels.

=== Eponymy ===
"Pelargonium" comes from the Greek ("pelargos" which means "Stork", and another name for pelargoniums is "storksbills" due to the shape of their fruit). "Crispum" refers to the crisped, crinkled leaf-margins.

== Cultivars and hybrids ==
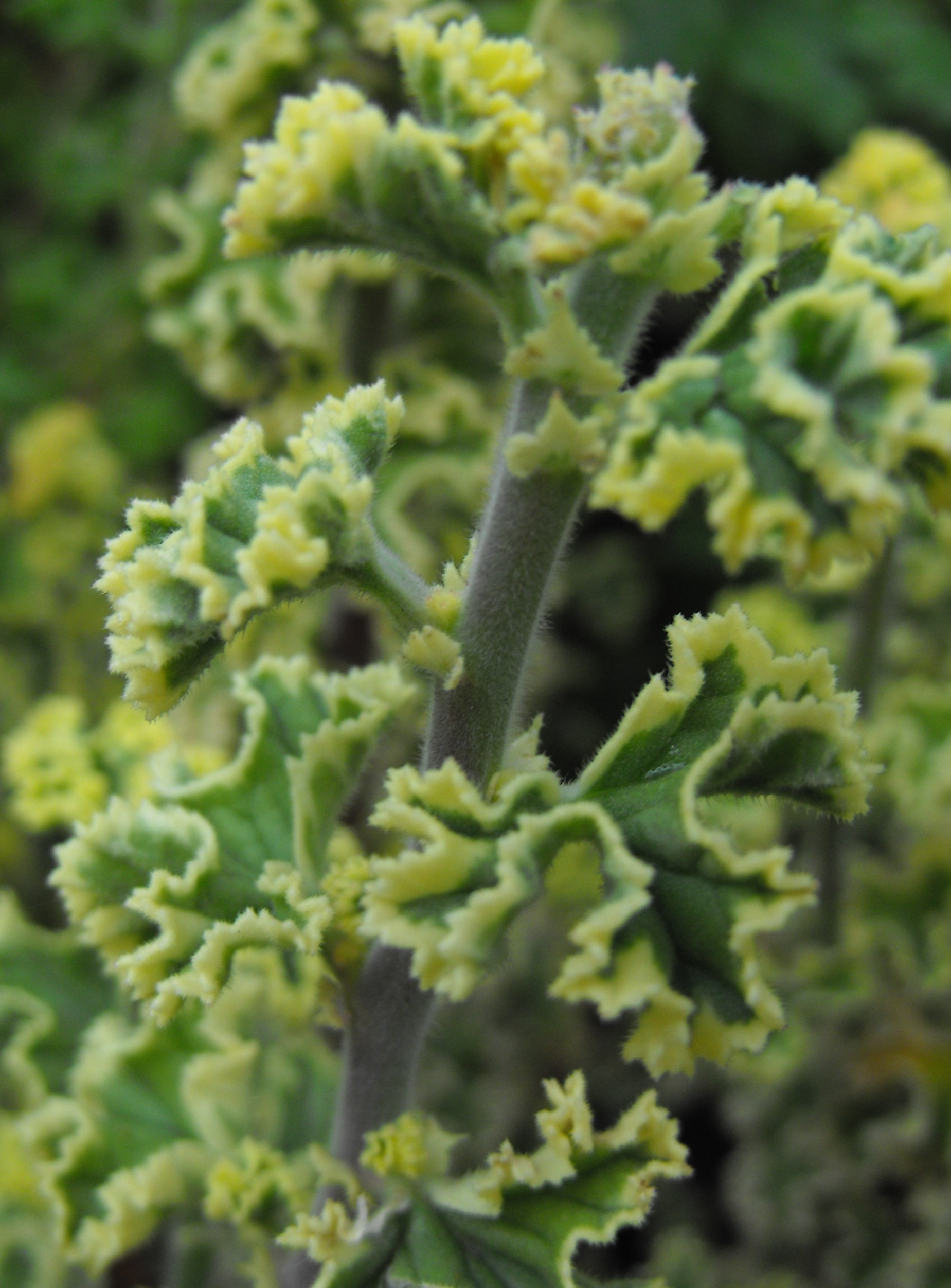
A variegated cultivar of Pelargonium crispum in cultivation.

There are many cultivars and hybrids of Pelargonium crispum as it hybridizes readily with other species in the Pelargonium subgenus. These cultivars and hybrids include:

- Pelargonium × nervosum - A lime scented hybrid between P. crispum and another species (possibly P. principissae according to Robert Sweet (botanist)). P. × nervosum is slightly hairy and has deep pink flowers. A variety of P. × nervosum is P. × torrento or 'Cola Bottles'. This variety has a slight ginger or cola smell as well as citrus.
- Pelargonium × melissinum - The lemon balm pelargonium (lemon balm - Melissa officinalis). This is a hybrid between P. crispum and Pelargonium graveolens.
- Pelargonium × citriodorum (synonym - 'Prince of Orange') - An orange scented pelargonium. A hybrid between P. crispum and P. × limoneum with small pale pink flowers.
- Pelargonium crispum 'Cy's Sunburst' - A small, compact variety with small variegated yellow leaves and pink flowers. It has a very strong lemon scent. P. Cy's Sunburst was bred the American plantsman; Cyrus Hyde and appears on his nursery website catalogue.
- Pelargonium crispum 'variegatum' (synonym - 'Prince Rupert') - A variety with variegated silvery leaves.
- Pelargonium crispum 'Peaches and Cream' - A variety with distinctly peach scented leaves.
- Pelargonium 'Poquita' - Grapefruit scented variety of the P. × nervosum hybrid.
- Pelargonium × limoneum - A hybrid with uncertain parentage but crispum is almost certainly one parent plant. It has small toothed leaves and quite large magenta flowers. It has a lemon/lime/rose/strawberry/cinnamon scent; different people detect different smells but it certainly has a citrus smell.
- Pelargonium 'Lady Scarborough' - A very popular cultivar that smells of ripe strawberries. It has leaves very similar P. × limoneum with pale pink flowers and red veining in the leaves occurs as the leaves age. Presumed to be in the crispum group but this is not certain. Arthur Tucker says it is similar to P. englerianum.

Note: Most Angel Pelargoniums are crosses between a regal pelargonium and Pelargonium crispum.

== Distribution and habitat ==
This species occurs in the Western Cape Province, South Africa, between Worcester in the north, and Bredasdorp in the south, as well as eastwards into the Little Karoo region.

It occurs in rocky, sandy soil on lower slopes, in arid proteoid fynbos as well as renosterveld vegetation.

== Uses ==
As well as being a houseplant or outdoor perennial depending on climate, Pelargonium crispum has a couple of other uses. Firstly, the leaves are edible and are used in salads or for flavouring cakes and stir-fries. Secondly, the leaves are very aromatic and can be used in something like potpourri.
