= Synanthrope =

Wild animal or plant that lives near and benefits from people

Pigeons intermingle with tourists in Venice

A synanthrope (from Ancient Greek σύν (sýn) 'together, with' and ἄνθρωπος (ánthrōpos) 'man') is an organism that adapted to live near humans and evolved to benefit (either commensally, mutually or amensally) from human settlements and their environmental modifications. The term is usually used to describe wildlife (particularly urban wildlife), including many animals and plants regarded as pests or weeds (see also anthropophilia for animals who live close to humans as parasites), but does not typically include domesticated animal and plant species (even though they are synanthropic in every sense) and captive animals in cages/pens, zoos and aquaria.

Common synanthrope habitats and niches include buildings (e.g. houses, sheds and barns), non-building structures (e.g. granaries, greenhouses, bridges and towers), urban green spaces (e.g. parks, gardens and road verges), farms and ranches, canals/ditches and ponds, sewerages and rubbish dumps. Synanthropes might move between multiple habitats during different times of the day (for foraging, sociality or sleeping) and between seasons (for mating, nesting or dormancy).

== Zoology ==
Examples of synanthropes are various species of insects (ants, lice, bedbugs, silverfish, cockroaches, etc.), myriapods (millipedes and centipedes, notably the house centipede), arachnids (spiders, dust mite, etc.), reptiles (e.g. common house gecko, sunskinks), birds (house sparrows, gulls, swifts, rock doves, crows and magpies, honeyguides, swallows, black redstarts, and other passerines), various rodent species (especially rats, house mice, and squirrels), Virginia opossums, raccoons, certain monkey species, coyotes, deer, and other urban wildlife.

The brown rat is counted as one of the most prominent synanthropic animals and can be found in almost every place there are people.

== Botany ==
Synanthropic plants include pineapple weed, dandelion, chicory, and plantain. Plant synanthropes are classified into two main types – apophytes and anthropophytes.

Apophytes are synanthropic species that are native in origin. They can be subdivided into the following:

- Cultigen apophytes – spread by cultivation methods
- Ruderal apophytes – spread by development of marginal areas
- Pyrophyte apophytes – spread by fires
- Zoogen apophytes – spread by grazing animals
- Substitution apophytes – spread by logging or voluntary extension

Anthropophytes are synanthropic species of foreign origin, whether introduced voluntarily or involuntarily. They can be subdivided into the following:

- Archaeophytes – introduced before the end of the 15th century
- Kenophytes – introduced after the 15th century
- Ephemerophytes – anthropophytic plants that appear episodically
- Subspontaneous – voluntarily introduced plants that have escaped cultivation and survived in the wild without further human intervention for a certain period.
- Adventive – involuntarily introduced plants that have escaped cultivation and survived in the wild without further human intervention for a certain period.
- Naturalized or Neophytes – involuntarily introduced plants that now appear to thrive along with the native flora indefinitely.

== See also ==
- Adventive plant
- Archaeophyte
- Assisted migration
- Commensalism
- Domestication
- Ecosystem management
- Environmental impact of agriculture
- Escaped plant
- Genetic pollution
- Hemeroby
- Hemerochory
- Human impact on the environment
- Introduced species
- Invasive species
- Native American use of fire in ecosystems
- Naturalisation
- Neophyte
- Satoyama
- Social forestry in India
- Urban wildlife

== Literature ==
- Herbert Sukopp & Rüdiger Wittig (eds.): Urban Ecology . 2nd edition G. Fischer; Stuttgart, Jena, Lübeck, Ulm; 1998: p. 276 ff. ISBN 3-437-26000-6
