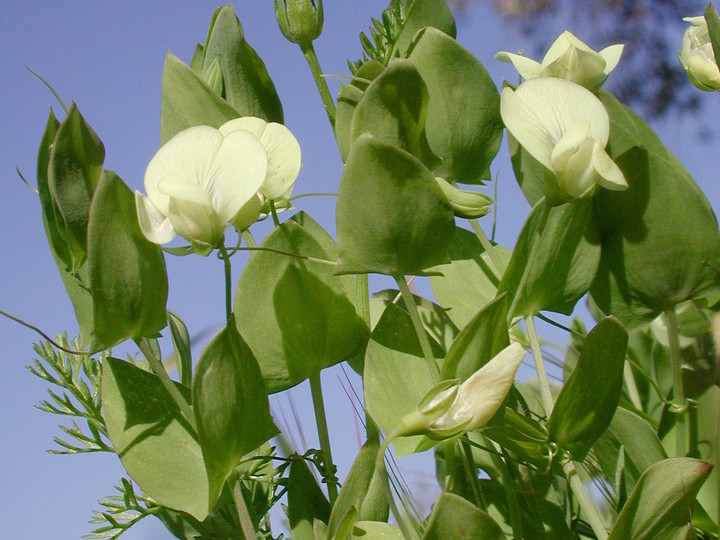

Conservation status
- Least Concern (IUCN 3.1)

Scientific classification
- Kingdom: Plantae
- Clade: Tracheophytes
- Clade: Angiosperms
- Clade: Eudicots
- Clade: Rosids
- Order: Fabales
- Family: Fabaceae
- Subfamily: Faboideae
- Genus: Lathyrus
- Species: L. aphaca

Binomial name
- Lathyrus aphaca L.

Synonyms
- Orobus aphaca (L.) Doll

= Lathyrus aphaca =

Species of legume

Lathyrus aphaca, known as the yellow pea or yellow vetchling, is an annual species in the family Fabaceae with yellow flowers and solitary, pea-like fruits. It originated in the Middle East and has spread throughout Europe and beyond as a weed of cultivated fields and roadsides. The fruits are eaten as a supplement to diets in some parts of South Asia but are narcotic and potentially toxic in large quantities.

== Description ==
Lathyrus aphaca, known as the yellow pea or yellow vetchling, is an annual species in the family Fabaceae (formerly Leguminosae). Plants grow to about 100 cm tall, are pale green to glaucous, glabrous, and have angled but unwinged stems. The leaves are reduced to simple (unbranched) tendrils and what look like leaves are actually stipules, which are ovate-hastate in shape and up to 50 mm long. The flowers are usually solitary and yellow (often streaked with violet), 10–13 mm in length, and held on long (up to 50 mm) stalks branching from the leaf axils. The flowers, which are bisexual, have 10 stamens and 1 style. Lathyrus aphaca is diploid, with 14 chromosomes.

== Distribution and habitat ==
It is believed to have evolved in the Middle East, around Syria and Jordan, along with other leguminous species which have a centre of diversity in that region. Edible species of pea were first cultivated in the Fertile Crescent, while weeds such as L. aphaca are believed to have adapted naturally to an arable or similar human-disturbed habitat between about 23,000 and 11,000 years ago. Lathyrus aphaca itself has some advantages as a farmland weed, being able to fix nitrogen and thus help to fertilise the soil, as well as being edible in small quantities if present in the grain harvest, although it is narcotic when consumed in larger amounts.

The native habitat of L. aphaca is most likely to be the dry, limestone scrubland in the Middle East sometimes known as phrygana or garrigue. In these countries it is found in both wild and cultivated habitats. It can be an aggressive agricultural weed, infesting mainly wheat, but also other crops, such as sugarcane in Pakistan. The expansion of farming over the last 10,000 years allowed L. aphaca to increase its range to southern Asia, as far as Bangladesh, and southern Europe as far as Portugal and even the Azores. In these regions it is often considered native, but it is more likely that it is an ancient introduction, or archaeophyte, which has found a natural or semi-natural analogue of its phrygana habitat, where it can persist in the wild. In Portugal it is considered native only in the Calcareous Western Centre biome, despite being present throughout the country as an agricultural weed. It is more likely that it is a well-established archaeophyte there.

In northern Europe, L. aphaca has not generally found any semi-natural analogue of its native arid scrub habitat. In Poland it is described as occurring 'in a different type of habitats, e.g. in the vegetation of forest edges representing the Trifolio-Geranietea sanguinei class, on dry lawns, transport route edges (especially along railway lines), in orchards, arable fields and fallows.' Since the early 20th century, it has gone into decline throughout Europe due to improved seed cleaning techniques, and it has largely been eradicated from cereal crops. In the Netherlands, it has declined by 75-100% since 1950, and in Germany and Poland there is a similar story. Meanwhile, however, it has become established as an agricultural weed further afield, in the United States, South Africa and Australia.

== In the United Kingdom ==
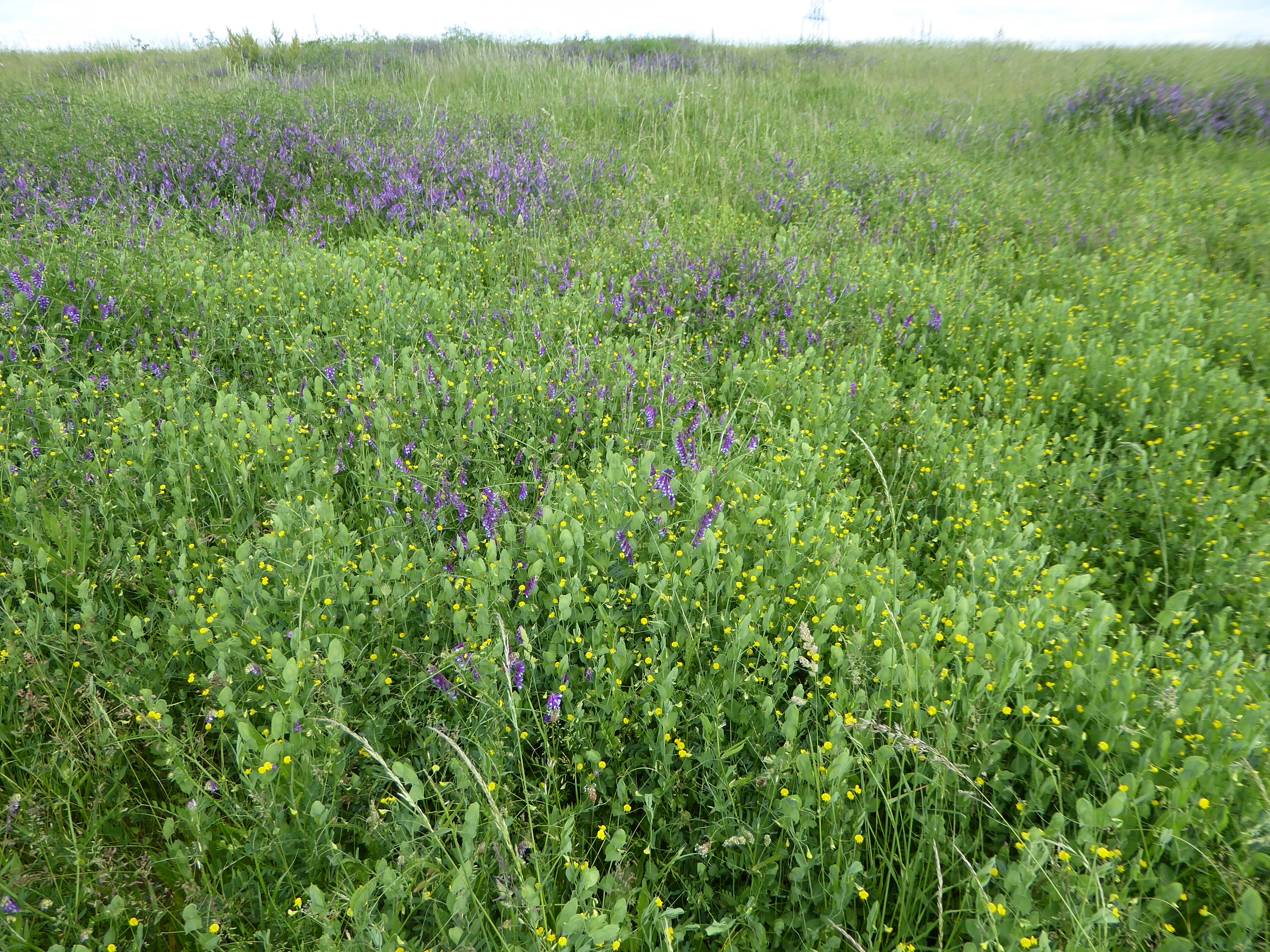
Sward of Lathyrus aphaca at Swanscombe

In Britain yellow vetchling has been recorded since 1632, when it was found by Thomas Johnson near Gravesend. This is sufficiently early to earn it a place as either a native or a long-naturalised arable weed (archaeophyte), as opposed to a recent introduction (neophyte). In the absence of any further information, therefore, British authors are free to describe it as a native or an introduced plant as they choose. A semi-natural habitat suggests that it is native, whereas an arable field suggests an archaeophyte. Roadsides are difficult to interpret, and there are many weeds of roadsides which are considered native in various regions across Britain despite the obvious route of introduction. This uncertainty is nicely summed up by Rumsey, who writes "[it] may be a long-established introduction rather than a native species… and may have been introduced as a seed contaminant of leguminous crops." It is, however, usually treated as native and it is classified as VU (Vulnerable) in the Red List.

In 2021 Natural England designated Swanscombe Peninsula in Kent a Site of Special Scientific Interest, partly for its population of yellow vetchling.
