= Adventive plant =

Plants that are alien to the native flora

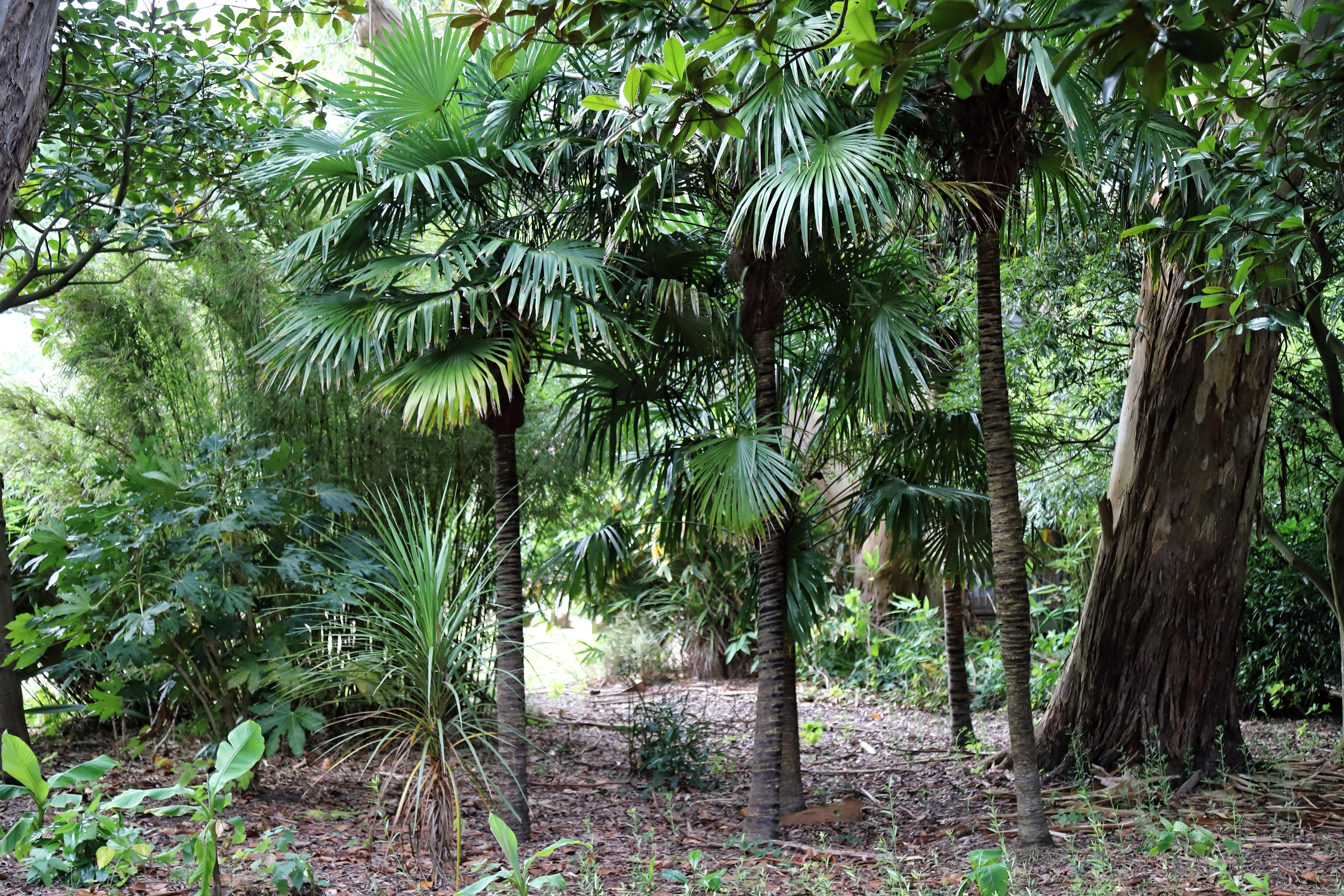
Trachycarpus fortunei in West Sussex, England

Adventive plants, also known as alien plants, foreign plants or casual plants are alien plant species appearing in a place that does not correspond to their area of origin, in contrast to the native species. These plants can arrive by natural means (such as wind or animal) or by human intervention (either intentional or accidental).

Although some alien plants become naturalized, others do not become established, thereby distinguishing them from weeds or an invasive species. Many alien plants have been introduced to aesthetically improve public recreation areas or private properties, or for agricultural purposes. The term "adventive" is derived from the Latin adventus, "to arrive".

== Definitions ==
According to Dictionary.com, an adventive plant is "usually not yet well established". According to Collins Dictionary, adventive plants are "introduced to a new area and not yet established there". Various botanists in New Zealand have claimed that this term originates from Latin advena, meaning "stranger" or "immigrant", but these claims are unsubstantiated and go against current evidence for an adventus origin.

In the broadest sense, the term "adventive plants" is used to denote exotic plant species that are alien to the native flora. Though the word has different shades of meaning, as it is also used for species that settle into new environments, and are not self-sufficient or are rarely naturalized, but need an episodic population assistance from their homeland. Less broadly, the term is used for deliberately introduced species, but at times the term only includes species that have arrived on their own or by accident. If, however, an adventive or alien species becomes self-sustaining in its new geographic area, it is then naturalized.

Some adventive species never become established or are usually not yet well established, even though many others can still establish and maintain themselves. Moreover, some adventive plants will stay at the site where they were first introduced, likely finding the conditions meager and missing the means of dispersal to convey them to areas with more approbative conditions for growth. By and large, naturalized alien plants may be viewed as weeds. Though several adventive plant species are in harmony with their adoptive environment, having appearance of their being natives, and are sometimes mistaken for native species.

== Categorization ==
Depending on the question and perspective, adventitious plants are divided into different subcategories:

=== Classification according to establishment history ===
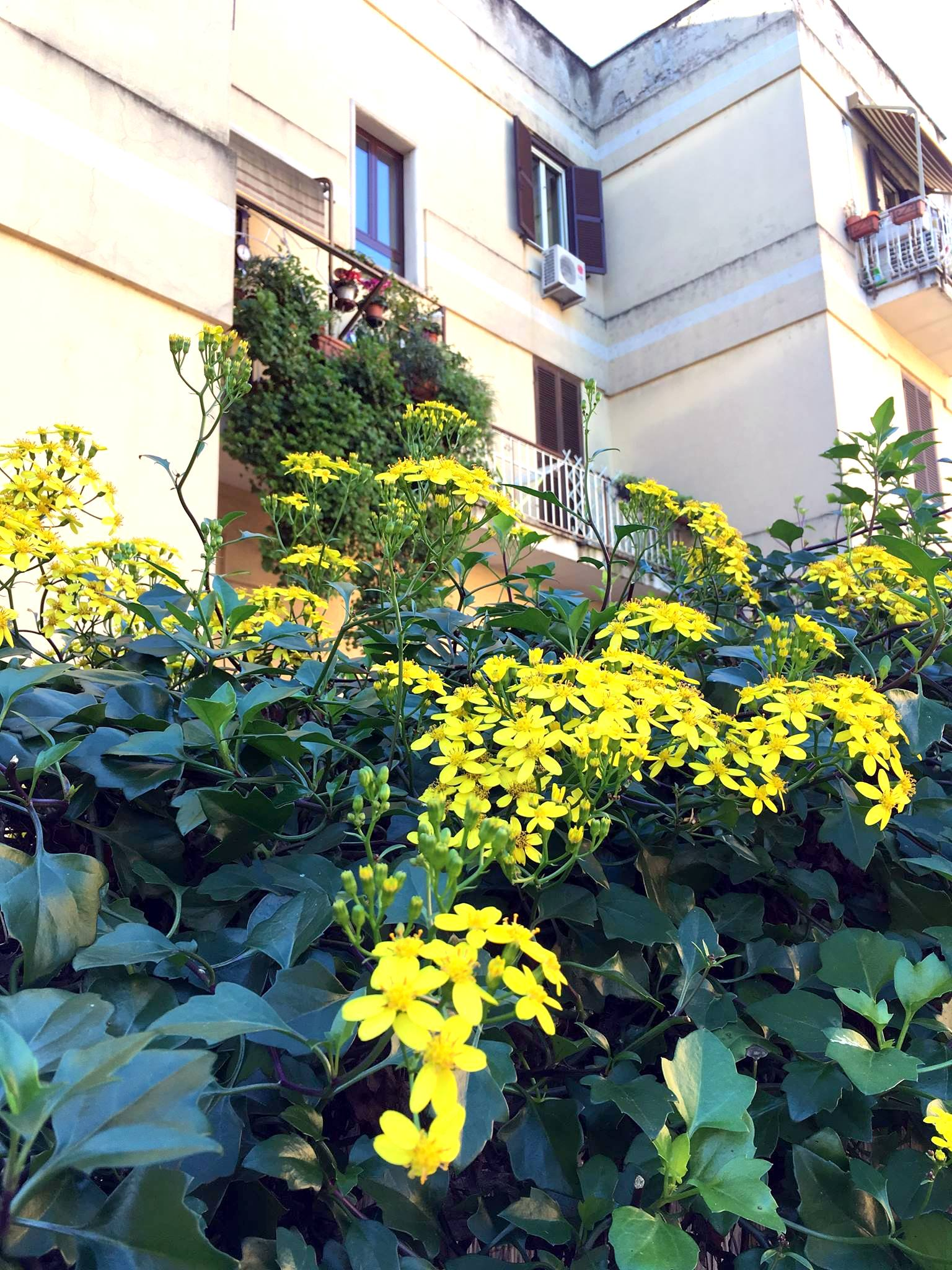
Senecio angulatus in Italy, a neophyte alien species

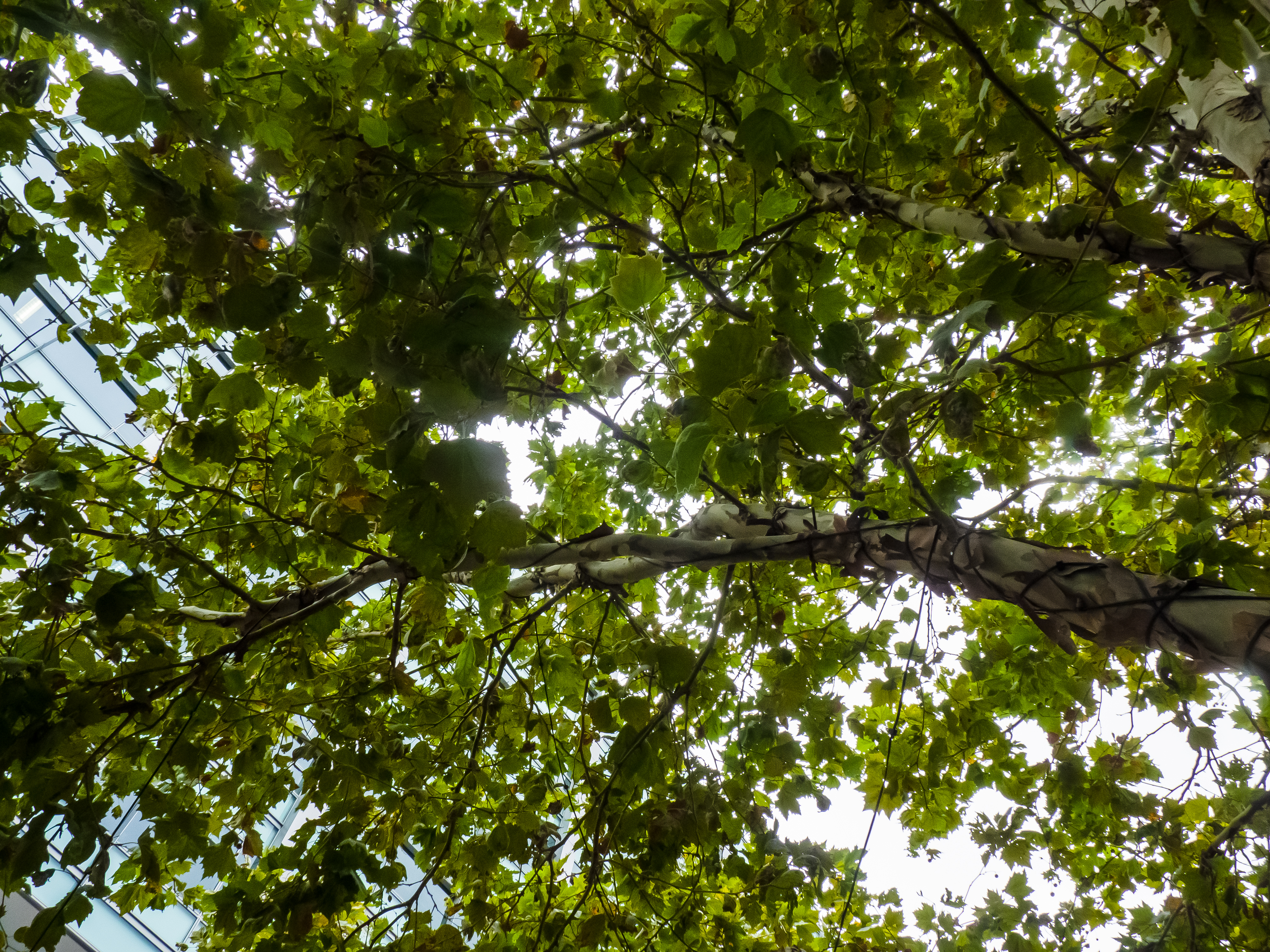
London plane in Sydney, Australia, which is an epecophyte alien species

- Archaeophytes were introduced before 1492
- Neophytes were introduced or immigrated after 1492.

The year 1492 is a conventionally chosen reference point. With the "discovery" of America and the Age of Discovery and colonialism, alien species from other parts of the world came to new areas on a large scale. Most of the archaeophytes immigrated with the introduction of agriculture (in the Neolithic). The status of a species as an archaeophyte is usually deduced (from the location and ecology of the species) and is hardly directly detectable.

=== Classification according to the degree of establishment ===
- Agriophytes: Species that have invaded natural or near-natural vegetation and could survive there without human intervention.
- Epecophytes: Species that are only naturalized in vegetation units shaped by humans, such as meadows, weed flora or ruderal vegetation, but are firmly naturalized here.
- Ephemerophytes: Species that are only introduced inconsistently, that will die out of culture for a short period of time, or that would disappear again without a constant replenishment of seeds.

=== Classification according to immigration route ===
Spontaneous immigrants (sometimes referred to as "acolutophytes") immigrated on their own without direct human assistance, for example when new locations were created through culture or soil changes. Companions (sometimes also "xenophytes") were brought in through human transport. Examples would be seed companions, which were unintentionally sown due to their similarity to cultivated plant seeds, or “wool adventures”, which were dragged into the wool fleece during the transport of sheep's wool.

Feral species or cultural refugees in the narrower sense are those that were originally cultivated, but later escaped from the culture and were able to spread on their own. Such descendants of original cultural clans are subject to natural evolution as they become wild and can more or less quickly differ both from the culture form itself and from the original wild clan that preceded the culture.

== Habitat ==
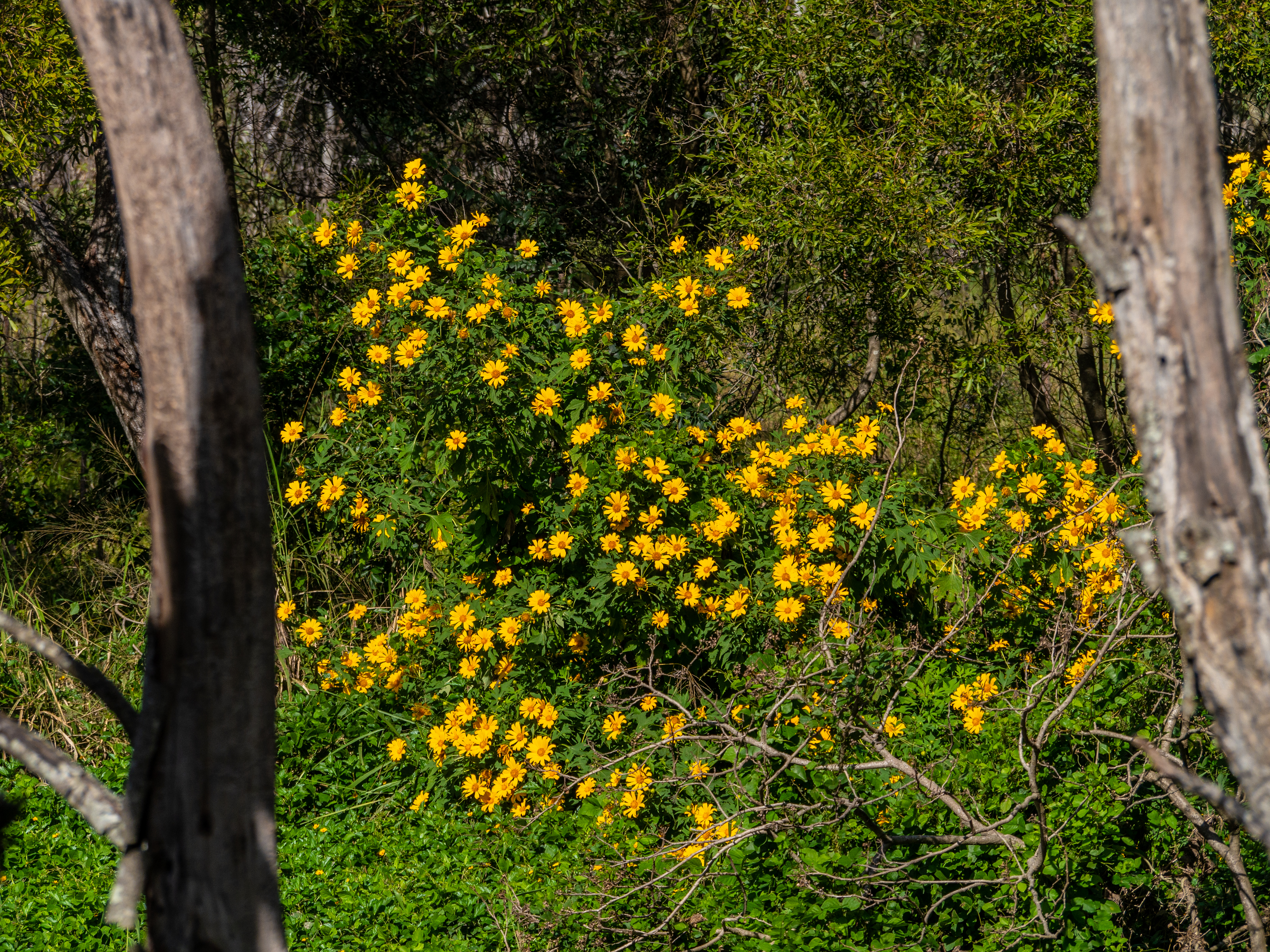
Tithonia diversifolia, an alien plant (in Brisbane) that generally remains at the site where first introduced.

Adventive plants are often found at freight stations, along railway lines and port areas as well as airports, but also on roads. Seeds of many species were accidentally imported there with the import of goods (so-called agochoria). Occasionally, seed contamination also introduces new plants that could reproduce for a short period of time (so-called speirochory). Agochory and speirochory are sub-forms of hemerochory. The seeds can also hang in wheel arches so that they can be transported and distributed along highways.

The proportion of adventive or alien species in open ruderal corridors at such locations can exceed 30% of the flora of these locations. In natural and near-natural vegetation, alien plants are much rarer. Their share here is between zero and about 5%. Introduced to the United Kingdom in 1616, the horse chestnut has become widely distributed across the country. Though an alien, its leaves attract insects which serve as a food source for populations of native birds.

Alien species have been observed to undergo rapid evolutionary change to adapt to their new environments, with changes in plant height, size, leaf shape, dispersal ability, reproductive output, vegetative reproduction ability, level of dependence on the mycorrhizal network, and level of phenotype plasticity appearing on timescales of decades to centuries.

=== Purpose ===
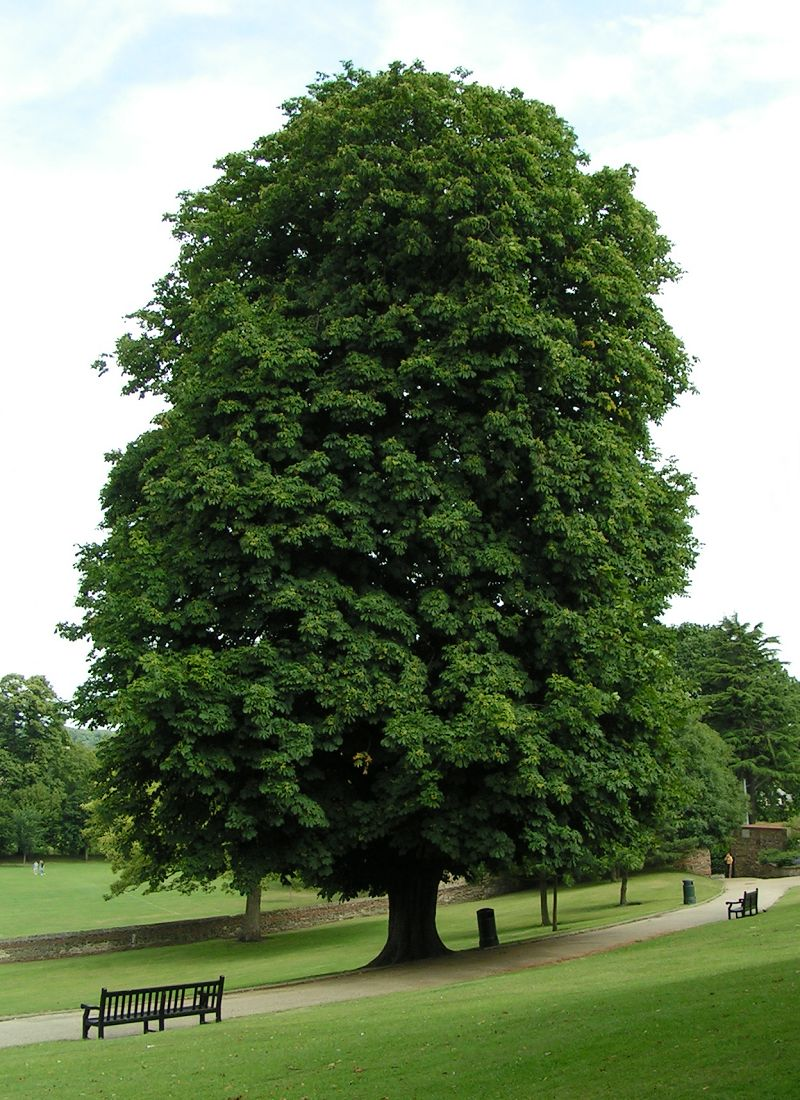
The horse chestnut, Aesculus hippocastanum, native to Greece and the Balkan peninsula, has been introduced across most of Europe and parts of North America as an ornamental plant.

The introduced Norway maple occupies a prominent status in many of Canada's parks. The transport of ornamental plants for landscaping use has and continues to be a source of many introductions. Some of these species have escaped horticultural control and become invasive. Notable examples include water hyacinth, salt cedar, and purple loosestrife.

Peaches originated in China, and have been carried to much of the populated world. Tomatoes are native to the Andes. Squash (pumpkins), maize (corn), and tobacco are native to the Americas, but were introduced to the Old World. Many alien species require continued human intervention to survive in the new environment. Others may become feral, but do not seriously compete with natives, but simply increase the biodiversity of the area. One example would be dandelions in North America, which have become an essential source of early season nectar for both native and introduced pollinators, and do not meaningfully compete with native grasses or flowers.

Many alien plants have been introduced into new territories, initially as either ornamental plants or for erosion control, stock feed, or forestry. Whether an exotic will become an invasive species is seldom understood in the beginning, and many non-native ornamentals languish in the trade for years before suddenly naturalizing and becoming invasive. Studies have shown that introduced species display a greater likeliness of naturalizing when there is an appropriate environmental match, the plant species are short lived herbs or cultivate from seeds.

=== Environmental problems ===
Intentional alien introductions have also been undertaken with the aim of ameliorating environmental problems. A number of fast spreading, alien plants such as kudzu have been introduced as a means of erosion control. Other species have been introduced as biological control agents to control invasive species. This involves the purposeful introduction of a natural enemy of the target species with the intention of reducing its numbers or controlling its spread. Another troublesome alien species is the Phyla canescens, which was intentionally introduced into many countries in North America, Europe, and Africa as an ornamental plant.

A form of unintentional alien introduction is when an intentionally introduced plant carries a parasite or herbivore with it. Some become invasive, for example, the oleander aphid, accidentally introduced with the ornamental plant, oleander.

== See also ==
- Introduced species
- Invasive species
- Hemerochory
- Native species
- Neophyte
- Colonisation
- Naturalisation
- Escaped plant
