= Ruderal species =

Plant species that is first to colonize disturbed lands

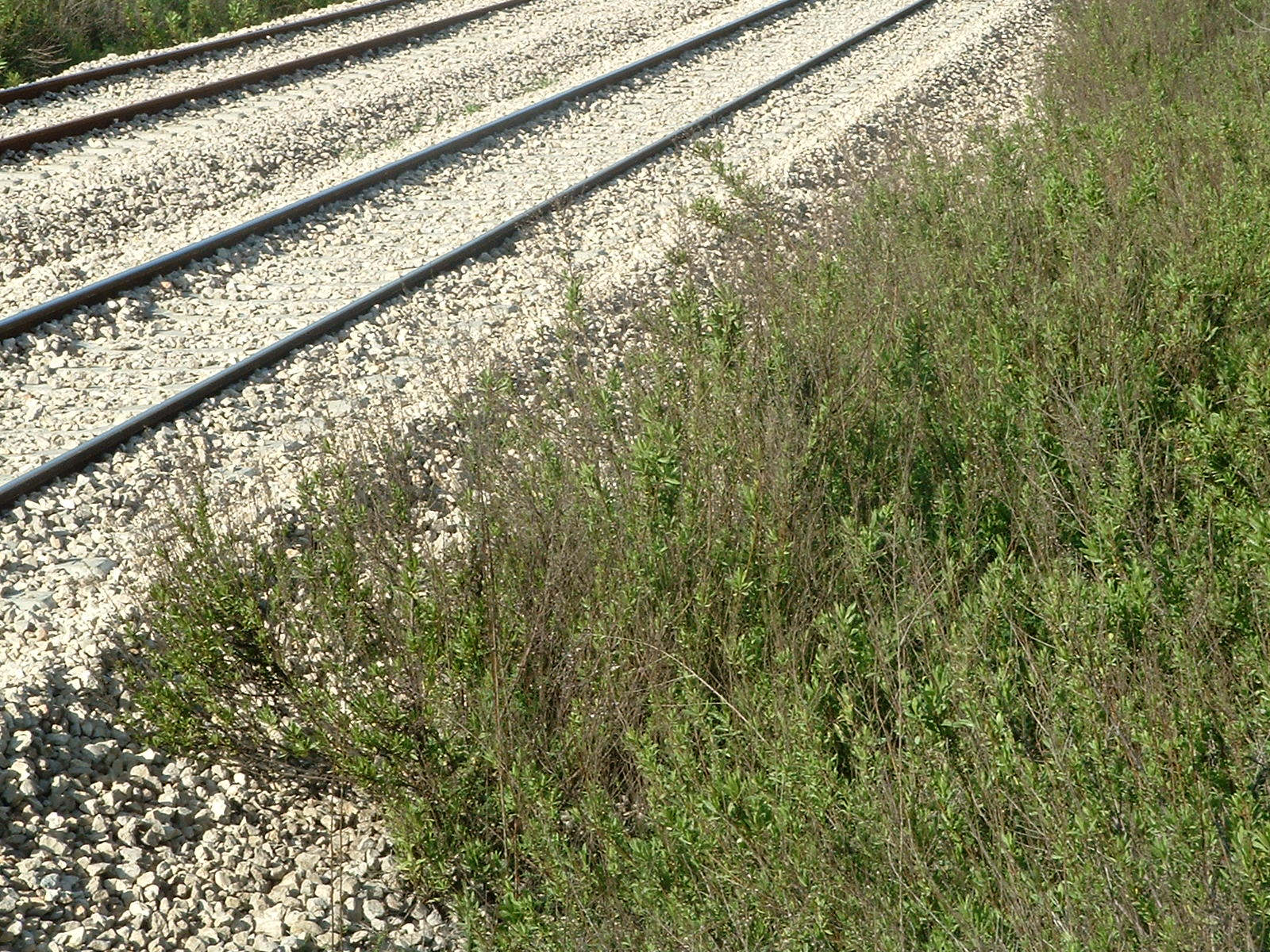
A single-species ruderal community of Dittrichia viscosa on gravel near Petah Tikva-Sgula railway station, Israel. (Compare with mixed-species image below.)

A ruderal species is a plant species that is the first to colonize disturbed lands. The disturbance may be natural – for example, wildfires or landslides – or the consequences of human activities, such as construction (of roads, of buildings, mining, etc.) or agriculture (abandoned fields, irrigation, etc.).

The term ruderal originates from the Latin word rudus, meaning "rubble".

Ruderal species typically dominate the disturbed area for a few years, gradually losing the competition to other native species. However, in extreme disturbance circumstances, such as when the natural topsoil is covered with a foreign substance, a single-species ruderal community may become permanently established. In addition, some ruderal invasive species may have such a competitive advantage over the native species that they, too, may permanently prevent a disturbed area from returning to its original state despite natural topsoil.

== Features ==
Features contributing to a species' success as ruderal are:

- Massive seed production
- Seedlings whose nutritional requirements are modest
- Fast-growing roots
- Independence of mycorrhizae
- Polyploidy

== Quantification ==
Ecologists have proposed various scales for quantifying ruderality, which can be defined as the "ability to thrive where there is disturbance through partial or total destruction of plant biomass" (Grime, Hodgson & Hunt, 1988). The ruderality scale of Grime presents values that are readily available, and it takes into account disturbance factors as well as other indicators such as the annual or perennial character of the plants.

== See also ==
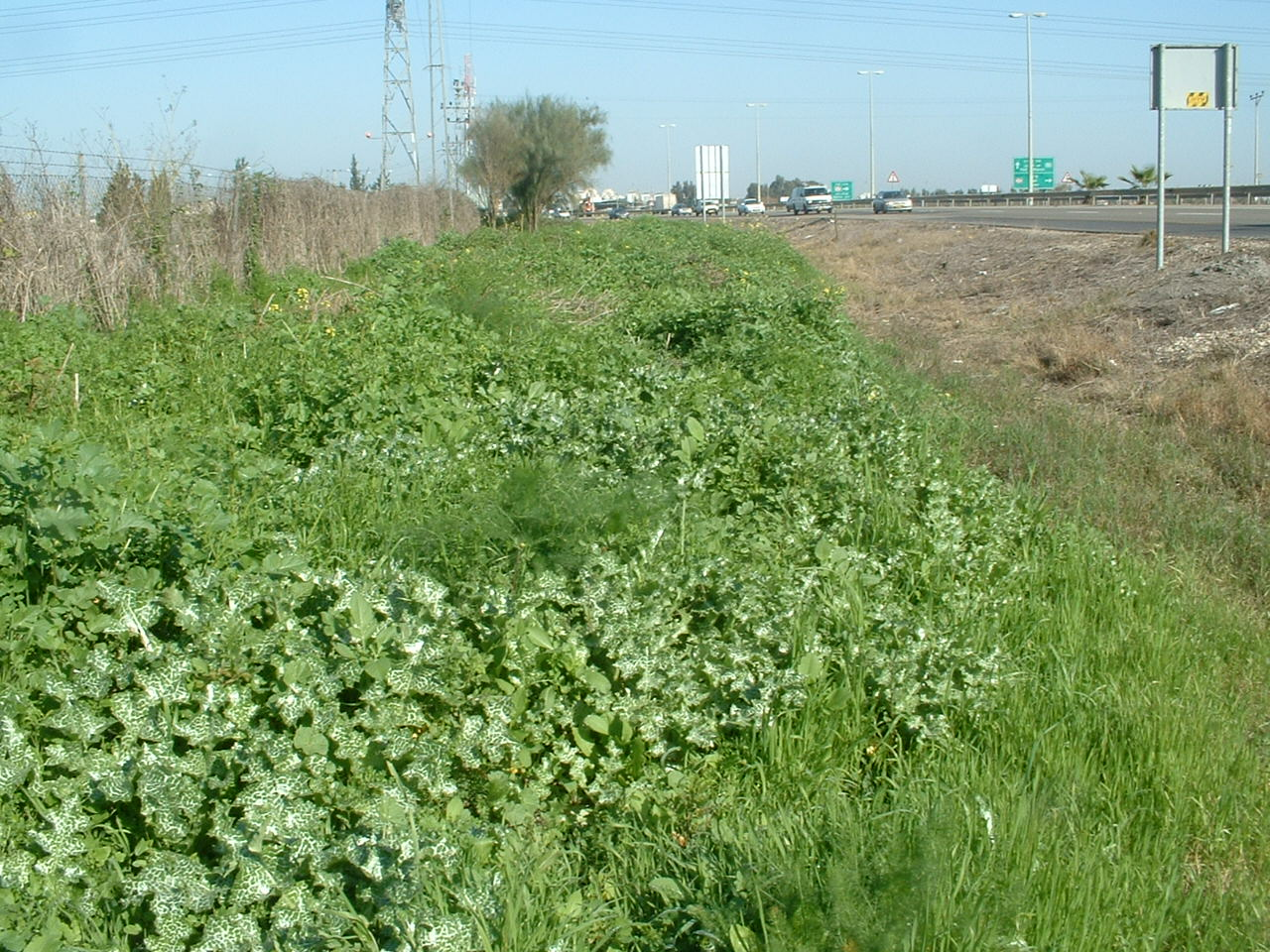
A mixed-species ruderal community on the side of Israel's road 40, north of the Yarkon River, where topsoil was left after the road-building activity.

- Edge effect
- Hemeroby
- Hemerochory
- Adventive plant
- Pioneer species
- Restoration ecology
- Supertramp (ecology)
- Examples of ruderal species:
  - Cannabis ruderalis (family Cannabaceae)
  - Conyza bonariensis (family Asteraceae)
  - Dittrichia viscosa (Asteraceae)
  - Nicotiana glauca (Solanaceae)
