= Volunteer (botany) =

Plant growing on its own

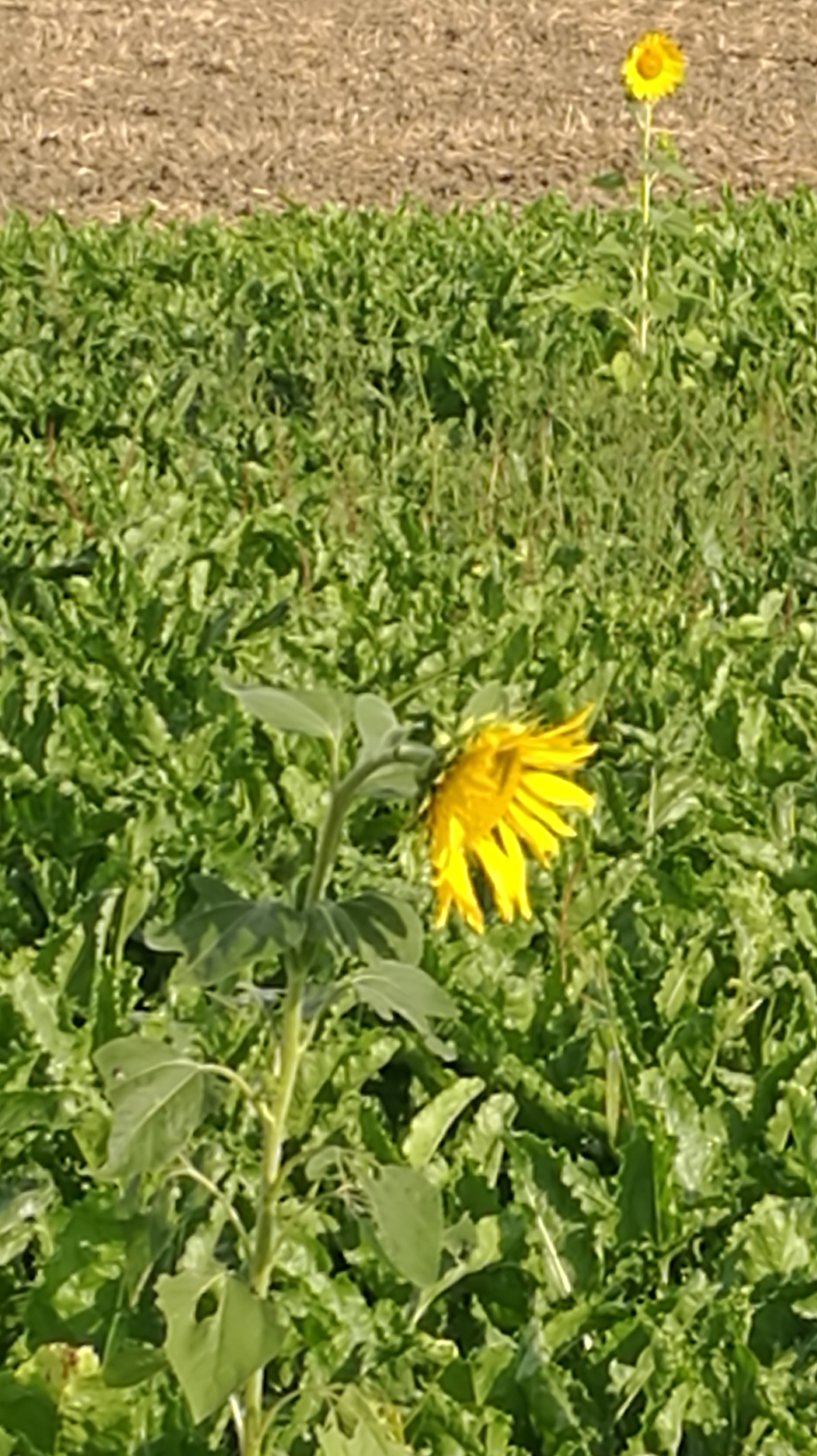
Volunteer sunflowers growing on the field that is now used for another crop, in Switzerland

In gardening and agronomic terminology, a volunteer is a plant that grows on its own, rather than being deliberately planted by a farmer or gardener. The action of such plants — to sprout or grow in this fashion — may also be described as volunteering.

== Background ==
Volunteers often grow from seeds that float in on the wind, are dropped by birds, or are inadvertently mixed into compost. Some volunteers may be encouraged by gardeners once they appear, being watered, fertilized, or otherwise cared for, unlike weeds, which are unwanted volunteers.

Volunteers that grow from the seeds of specific cultivars are not reliably identical or similar to their parent and often differ significantly from it. Such open pollinated plants, if they show desirable characteristics, may be selected to become new cultivars.

== Agriculture ==
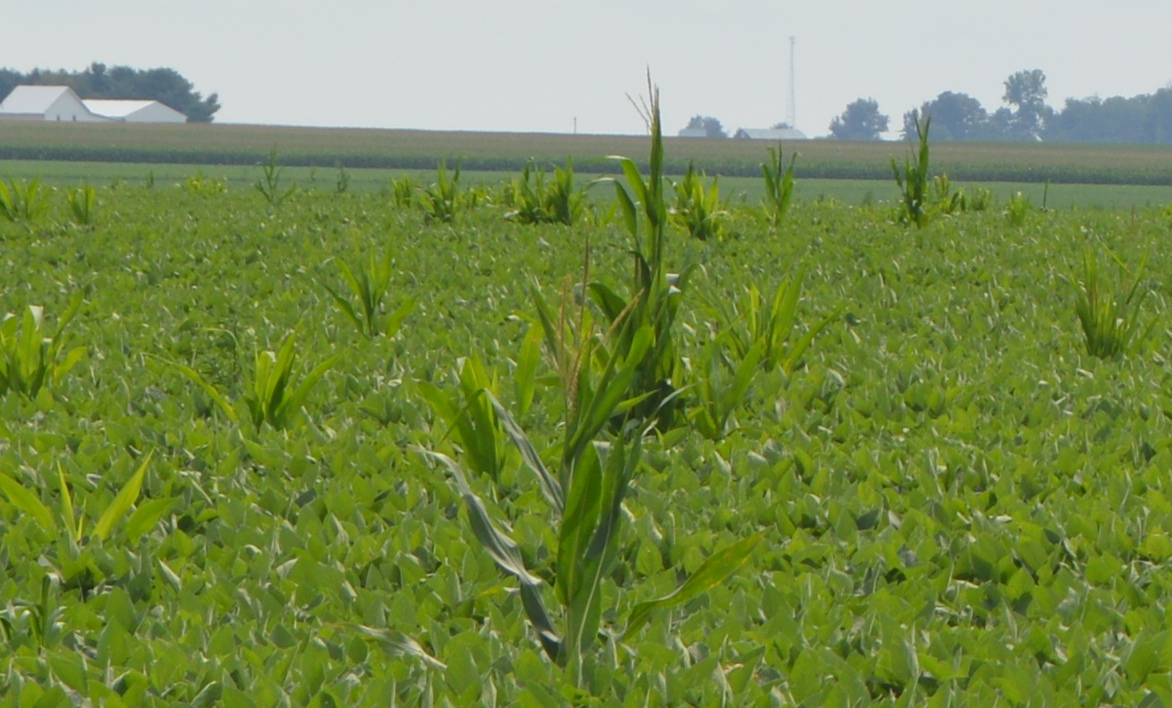
Maize growing in a soybean field in the central United States

In agricultural rotations, self-set plants from the previous year's crop may become established as weeds in the current crop. For example, volunteer winter wheat will germinate to quite high levels in a following oilseed rape crop, usually requiring chemical control measures.

In agricultural research, the high purity of a harvested crop is often desirable. To achieve this, typically a group of temporary workers will walk the crop rows looking for volunteer plants, or "rogue" plants in an exercise typically referred to as "roguing".

== See also ==
- Domestication
- Escaped plant
- Hemerochory
- Invasive species
- Noxious weed
- Weed
