= Hemeroby =

Human influence on an environment

Hemeroby, or hemerochora is a term used in botanical and ecological sciences. It is often associated to naturalness as the complementary term, with a high degree of hemeroby equating to a high human influence on a natural environment. However, the two terms are not inversely related.

== Etymology ==
The term is derived from the Greek hémeros and bíos. The word hemero-, hemer- means tame, cultivated. Bios is life. Hemeroby literally means "tamed life".

== Quantification ==
Various scales for quantifying hemeroby have been devised. Hemeroby indicators differ from naturalness indicators in that the hemeroby model reflects the potential natural vegetation on a given environment, whereas naturalness focuses on values and largely works with lightly affected areas.

== See also ==
- Human impact on the environment
- Rewilding
- Ruderal species
