= Hemerochory =

Propagation of plants by "the culture"

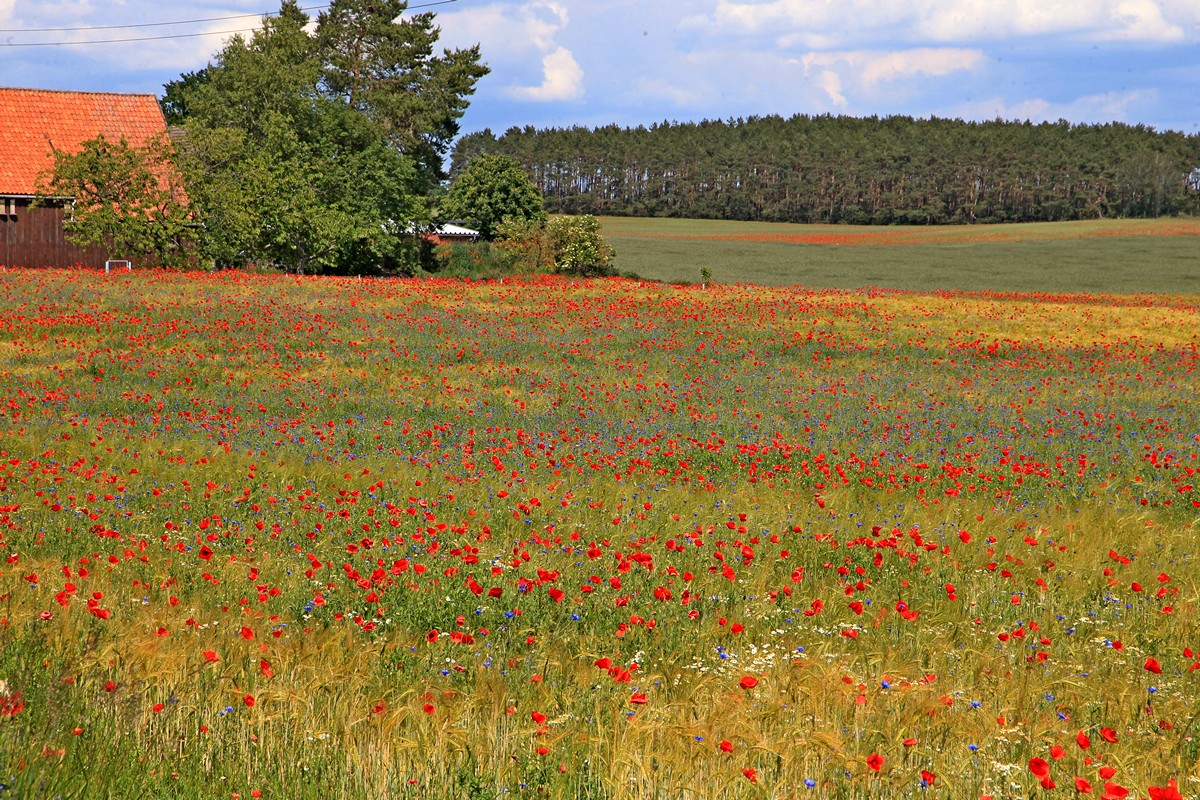
Poppies are hemerochoric plants.

Hemerochory (Ancient Greek ἥμερος, hemeros: 'tame, ennobled, cultivated' and Greek χωρίς choris: separate, isolated), or anthropochory, is the distribution of cultivated plants or their seeds and cuttings, consciously or unconsciously, by humans into an area that they could not colonize through their natural mechanisms of spread, but are able to maintain themselves without specific human help in their new habitat.

Hemerochory is one of the main propagation mechanisms of a plant. Hemerochoric plants can both increase and decrease the biodiversity of a habitat.

== Categorisation ==
Hemerochoric plants are classified according to the manner of introduction into, for example:

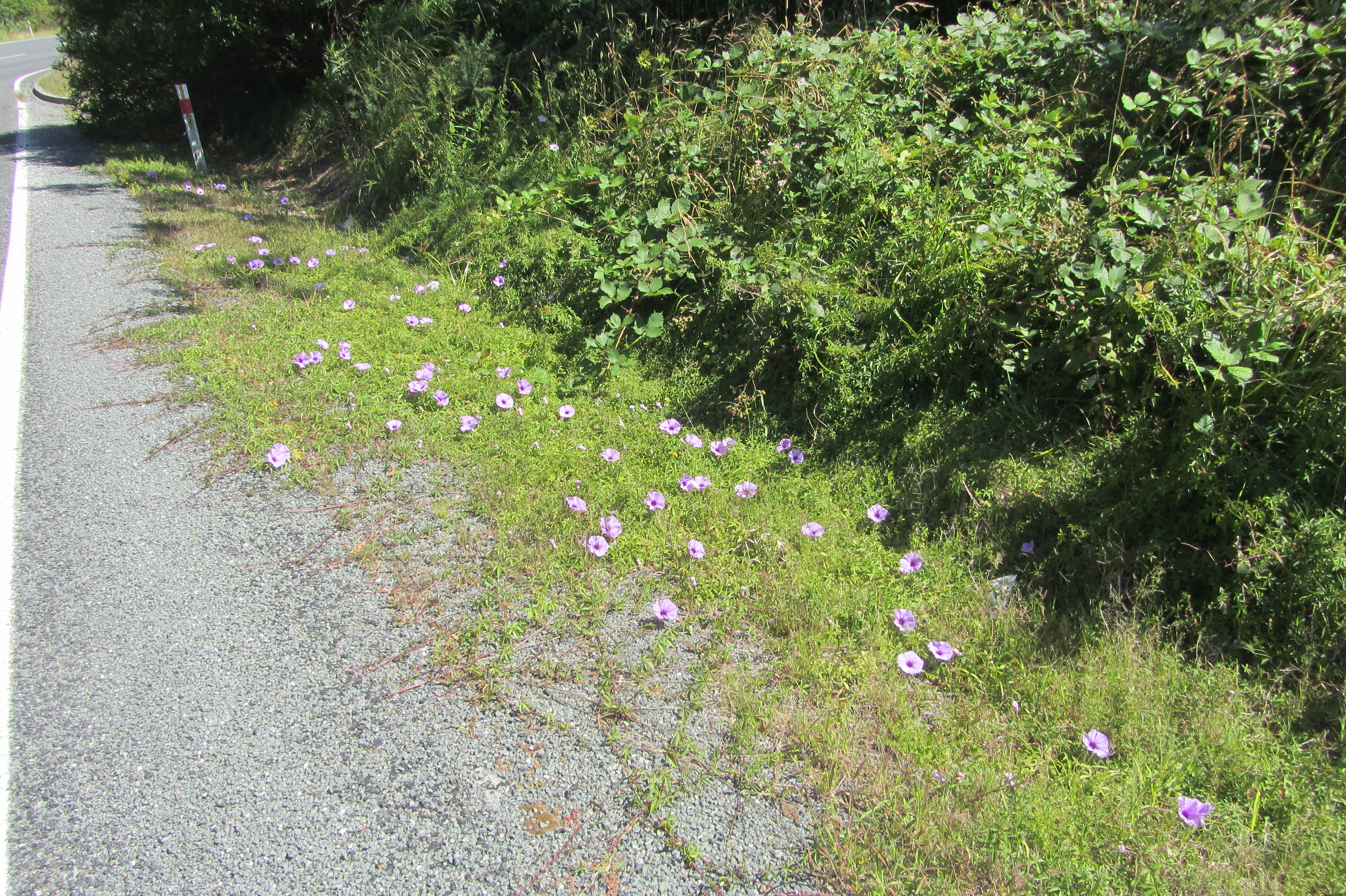
Ipomoea cairica trailing on a roadside with its purple flowers (possible agochoric dispersal).

- Ethelochory: the conscious introduction by seed or young plants.
- Speirochory: the unintentional introduction by contaminated seed. Examples are the true chamomile and the cornflower.
- Agochory: the introduction by unintentional transport with, among other things, ships, trains and cars. These plants are common in port areas, roadsides, stations and railways.

=== Division ===
Chronologically the hemerochoric plants are divided in:

- Archaeophytes: plants that were introduced before the onset of world trade around the year 1500, or before the year 1492 (the arrival of Europeans in the Americas).
- Neophytes: plants that were introduced later.

=== Related terms ===
Anthropochory is often used synonymously but does not mean exactly the same. Anthropochory is the spread by humans. The spread through domestic animals does not belong to the anthropochoric, but to the hemerochoric, because domestic animals belong to human culture. Strictly speaking, anthropochory means the spread through humans as a transport medium. These can also be native species that were either adapted from the outset to locations created by human cultural activity or have adapted to them afterwards; as a result, their area of distribution has often, but not always, increased.

== History ==
Hemerochorous spread of plants through human cultural activity very likely already happened in the Stone Age, but demonstrably at the latest in antiquity, namely along old trade routes. Fruits such as apples and pears gradually made their way along the Silk Road from the area around the Altai Mountains to Greece and from there to the gardens of the Romans, who in turn brought these cultivated plants to Central Europe, and some of these plants were eventually able to survive outside the culture. Many useful plants, such as tomato, potato, pumpkin and French bean did not reach Central Europe until the 16th century, after the American continent was discovered, and are now grown worldwide.

In the last 400 to 500 years the spread has expanded through trade and military campaigns, through explorers and missionaries. The latter brought countless plants with them from their travels both out of an interest in exotic plants, which were often included in the plant collections of princely courts, and for purely scientific purposes. In the context of botanical studies, the interest was often in the possible healing effects of these plants, but also in the expansion of botanical knowledge, or the plants were only used for collecting (herbaria).

Some ornamental plants also came to Europe because they promised a lucrative business. This applies, for example, to the camellias, one of which is also grown as a tea plant in Japan and China. While this species turned out to be not cultivable in Central Europe, people very quickly discovered the aesthetic appeal of the other camellia species as an ornamental plant. Botanical gardens played a major role in the acclimatization of such plants from distant habitats.

== Forms ==
=== Agochory ===
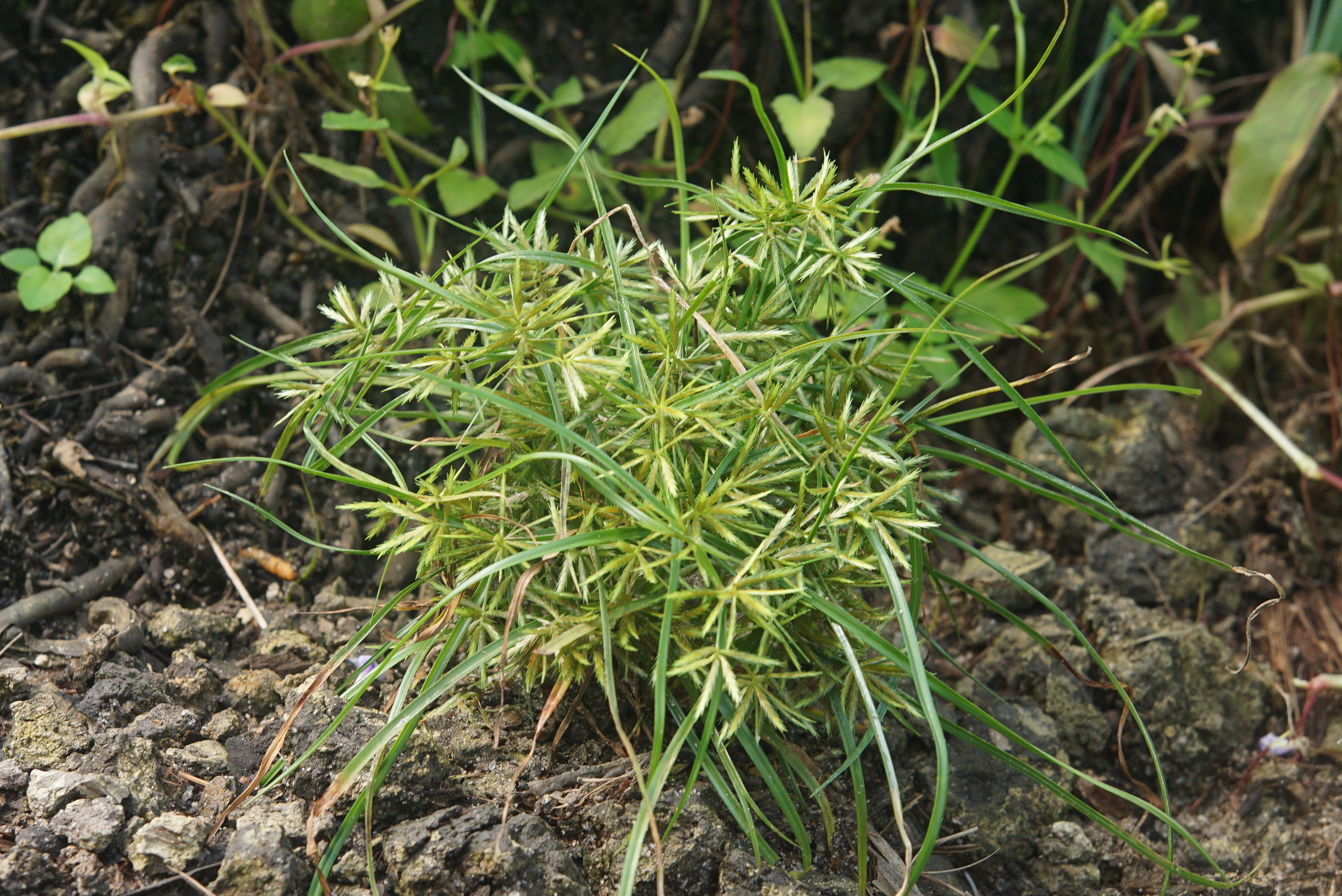
Tiger nuts are agochoric.

Agochoric plants are those that are spread through accidental transport. Unlike speirochoric plants, they are usually not sown on human-prepared soil. On land, agochoric plants used to be common in harbors, at train stations or along railway lines.

However, mainly aquatic plants are spread through agochory. Ballast water plays a major role in the agochoric spread of aquatic plants. Around the world, around ten billion tons of seawater and the organisms it contains are shipped in this way. Exporting countries in particular are affected by the spread of organisms through ballast water. The ships arrive at the ports with empty cargo hold, but fully pumped ballast tanks. In the draining of this ballast water, these ports receive thousands of cubic meters of seawater brimming with alien creatures now in a new environment. The seaweed Undaria pinnatifida, which is native to the Japanese coast, reached the Tasmanian coast via ballast water and has formed dense kelp forests along the coast since 1988, displacing the native flora and fauna. Caulerpa taxifolia is one of those plants that are often spread by ballast water. It is also spread by the fact that ships tear off parts of the algae with their anchors.

Australia was the first country to introduce a ballast water policy back in 1990 and is now the most determined to address this problem. Ships were asked not to take in ballast water in shallow and polluted bays and not to refuel with ballast water during the night, since then many marine organisms that are otherwise on the seabed rise to the surface of the water. Ships should also exchange their ballast water 200 kilometers away from the coastal waters, so that on the one hand the offshore species are not introduced into the more sensitive coastal waters and, on the other hand, no inhabitants of the coastal zone are transported to other continents.

=== Ethelochory ===
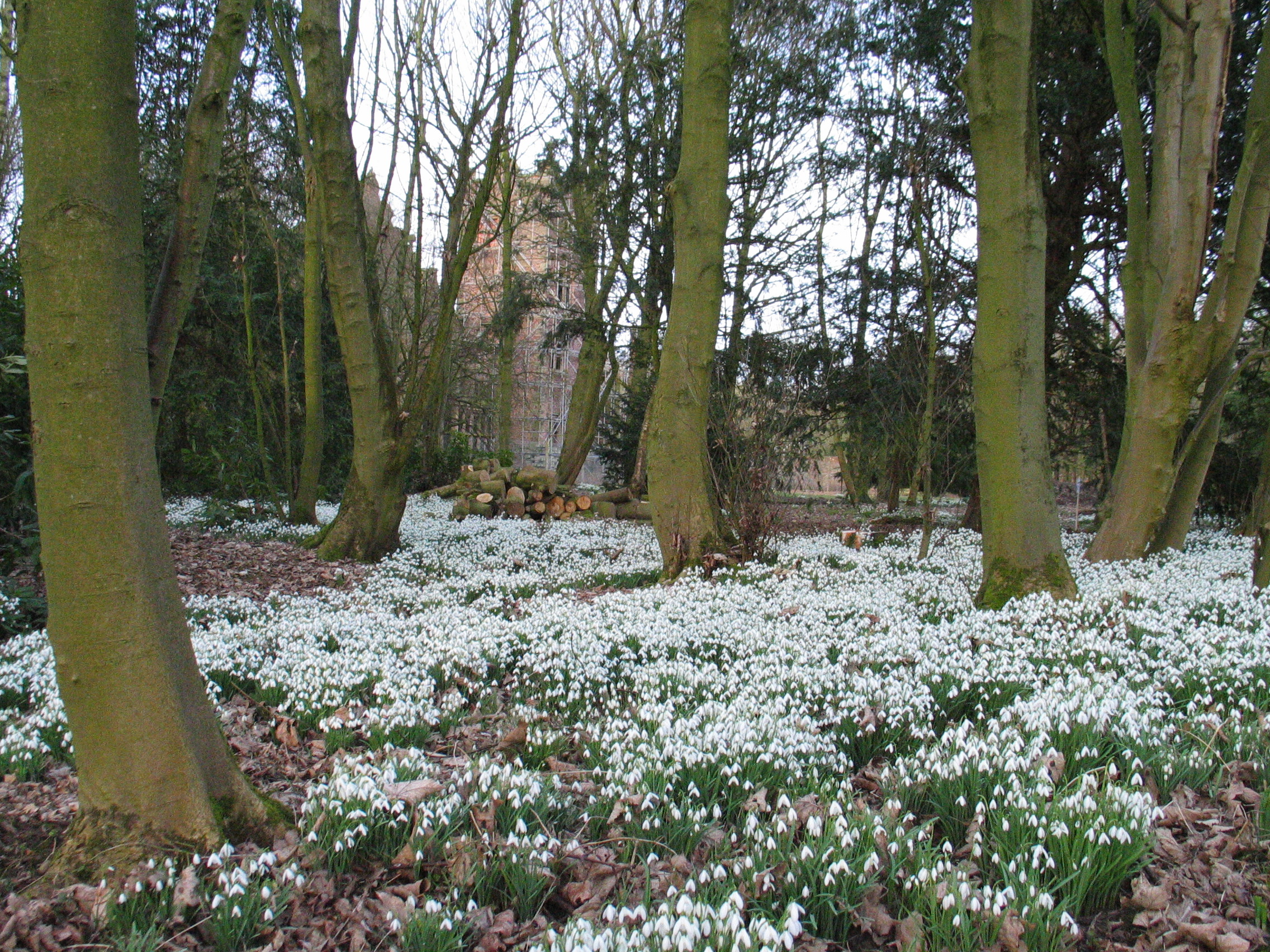
Galanthus are ethelochoric.

Ethelochory is intentional transportation of plants or seeds to different regions for agricultural and gardening purposes. Numerous crops that are important for human nutrition have been willingly spread by humans. Wheat, barley, lentil, beans, flax and poppy seeds, for example, are not typical plants for Central Europe, although they are all archaeotypes. People brought them after the beginning of the Neolithic (about 6,500 years ago) gradually from the eastern Mediterranean to central Europe and the rest of the world through the upcoming centuries. In central Europe, it is especially Cyperus esculentus which has been classified since the 1980s among the invasive species, because their tubers have been spread en masse, by sticking to vehicles or machines.

Many of the old cultivated plants have spread around the world, primarily through emigrants from Europe. Grown for at least 4,000 years, wheat was introduced to America in the 16th century and Australia in the 19th century. Oranges, lemons, apricots and peaches were originally native to China. They probably came via the Silk Road as early as the 3rd century BC. In Asia Minor and from there through the Romans to the Mediterranean. European settlers, in turn, used these species to grow fruit in suitable regions of America.

From the 16th century, ornamental plants were grown more and more. Species native to Europe were first introduced as garden plants. These include, for example, the gladioli, the ornamental onion, European bluebell, the snowdrop native to southeast Europe and the common clematis. Ornamental plants from more distant regions were added later. From East Asia in particular, a number of plants were introduced to Europe as exotics or for economic reasons.

=== Speirochory ===
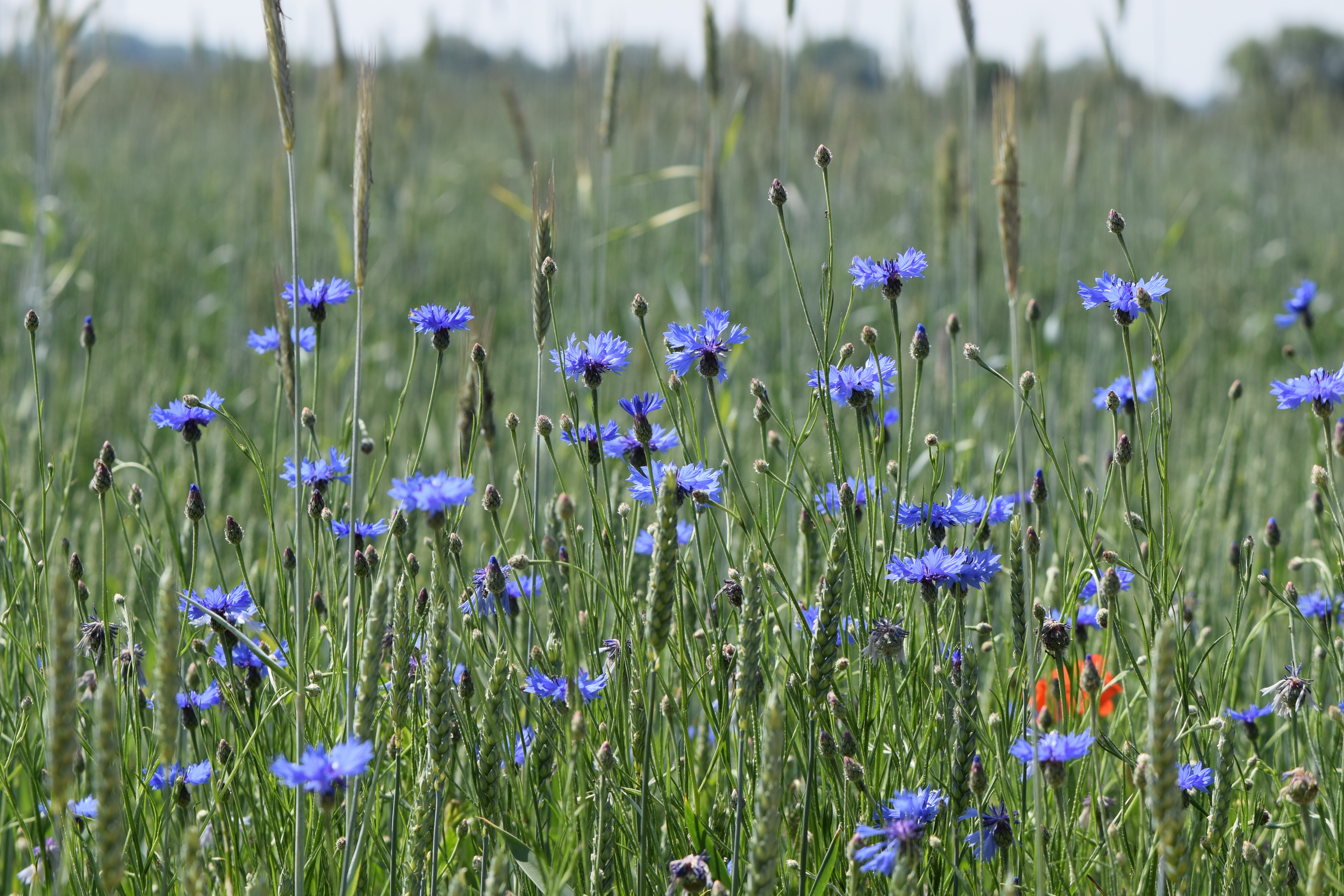
The cornflower is speirochoric.

Some plants were unintentionally introduced in this process; this unwanted hemerochory as a seed companion is called speirochory. Since every seed packet also contains seeds of the herbs of the field from which it comes, their competitors, the "weeds", were also sold through the trade in the seeds of the useful plant. The real chamomile is one of the plants that were unintentionally spread as a companion to seeds.

Speirochoric plants are sown on human-prepared soil and are competitors of the crops. Plants that are considered to be archaeophytes, such as the poppy, native to the Mediterranean area, the real chamomile, the cornflower and field buttercup, spread through the seeds with the grain in Central Europe. In the meantime, the seeds are cleaned more thoroughly using modern methods and the cultivation is hardly contaminated by pesticides or other control techniques.

In spite of this, Cuscuta campestris, which is classified as a problematic weed in Australia, was accidentally imported into the country together with basil seeds in 1981, 1988 and 1990.

== See also ==
- Assisted colonization
- Escaped plant
- Volunteer plant
- Adventive plant
