= Introduced species =

Species introduced by human activity

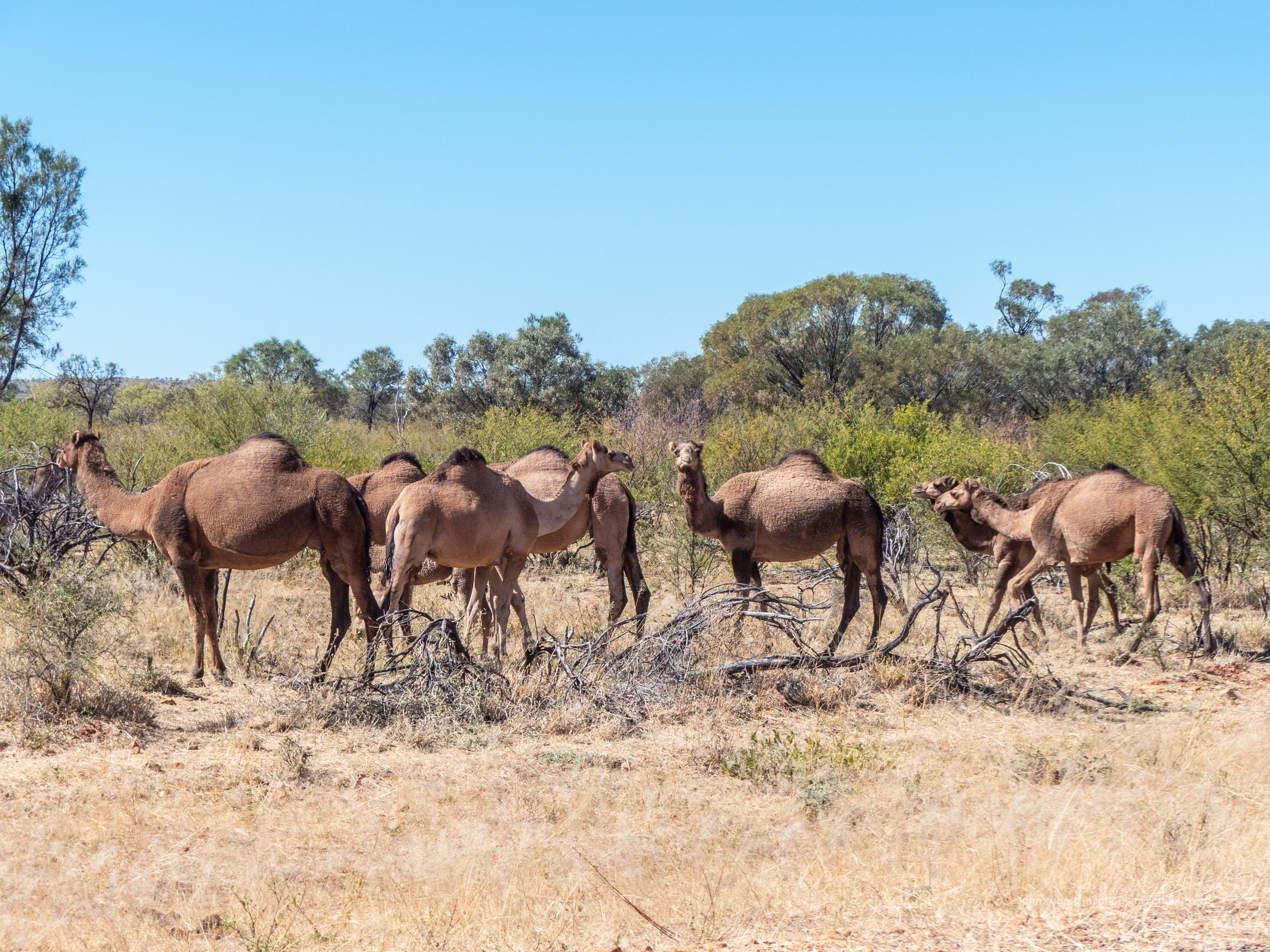
Feral camels in central Australia. Camels were introduced to Australia during the 19th century and subsequently established a free-ranging population in the country's arid interior.

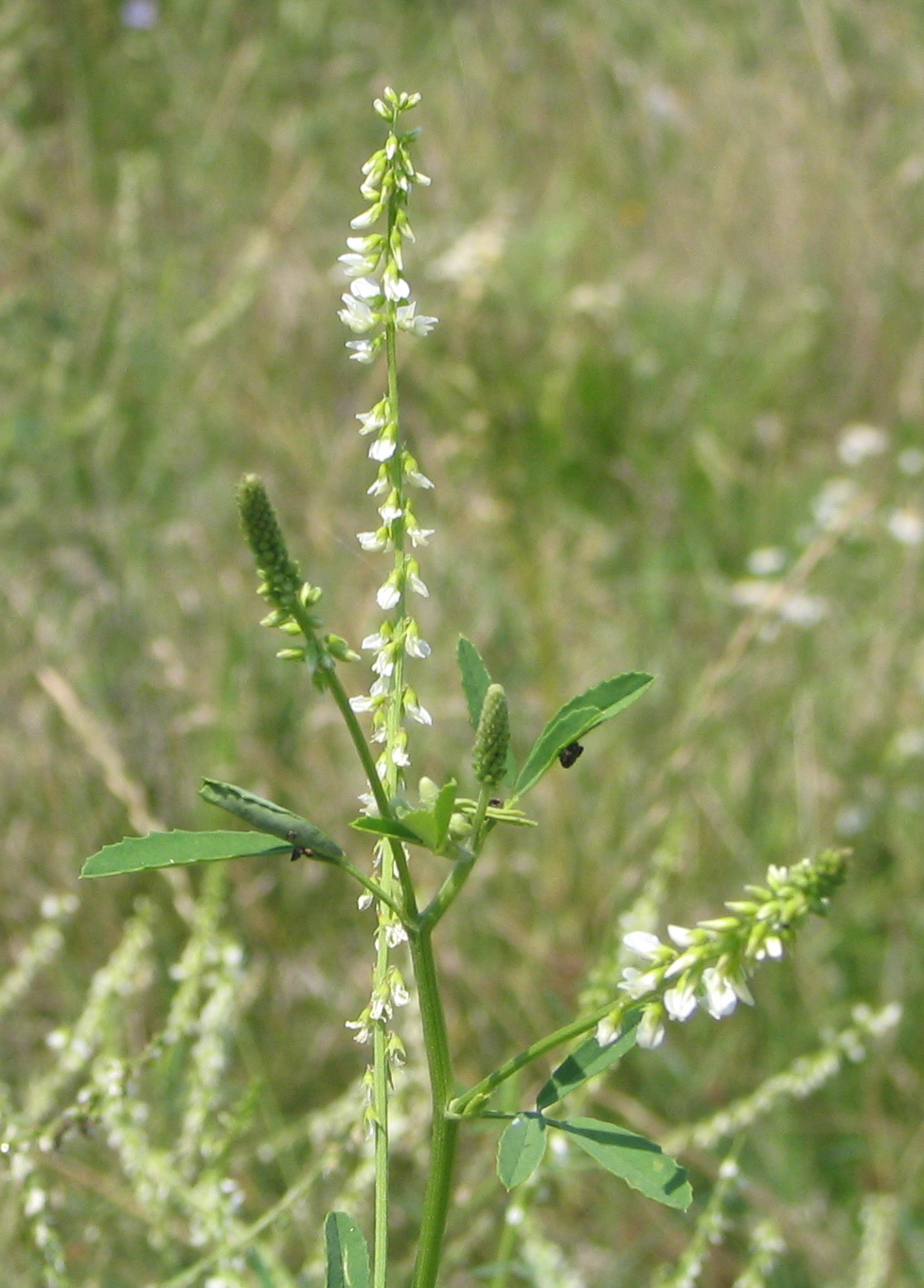
Sweet clover (Melilotus sp.), introduced and naturalized in the Americas from Europe as a forage and cover crop

An introduced species, alien species, exotic species, adventive species, immigrant species, foreign species, non-indigenous species, or non-native species is a species living outside its native distributional range, but which has arrived there by human activity, directly or indirectly, and either deliberately or accidentally. Non-native species can have various effects on the local ecosystem. Introduced species that become established and spread beyond the place of introduction are considered naturalized. The process of human-caused introduction is distinguished from biological colonization, in which species spread to new areas through "natural" (non-human) means such as storms and rafting. The Latin expression neobiota captures the characteristic that these species are new biota to their environment in terms of established biological network (e.g. food web) relationships. Neobiota can further be divided into neozoa (also: neozoons, sing. neozoon, i.e. animals) and neophyta (plants).

The impact of introduced species is highly variable. Some have a substantial negative effect on a local ecosystem (in which case they are also classified more specifically as an invasive species), while other introduced species may have little or no negative impact (no invasiveness), integrate well into the ecosystem they have been introduced to, and are generally not considered to be invasive. Some species have been introduced intentionally to combat pests. They are called biocontrols and may be regarded as beneficial as an alternative to pesticides in agriculture for example. In some instances the potential for being beneficial or detrimental in the long run remains unknown. The effects of introduced species on natural environments have gained much scrutiny from scientists, governments, farmers and others.

== Terminology ==
The formal definition of an introduced species from the United States Environmental Protection Agency is: "A species that has been intentionally or inadvertently brought into a region or area. Also called an exotic or non-native species".

In the broadest and most widely used sense, an introduced species is synonymous with "non-native" and therefore applies as well to most garden and farm organisms; these adequately fit the basic definition given above. However, some sources add to that basic definition "and are now reproducing in the wild", which means that species growing in a garden, farm, or house may not meet the criteria unless they escape and persist.

=== Subset descriptions ===
A wide range of terms is used to describe specific subsets or categories of introduced species, and the terminology continues to evolve for conceptual and practical reasons. Common examples include "invasive", "acclimatized", "adventive", "naturalized", and "immigrant" species. The term "invasive" refers to introduced species that cause ecological, economic, or other forms of damage within the area to which they have been introduced. Acclimatized species are introduced taxa that have undergone physical and/or behavioural changes that allow them to adjust to the new environment. Such species are not necessarily optimally adapted, but have characteristics sufficient for survival under the new conditions. Adventive species are often treated as synonymous with "introduced species", although the term is sometimes used specifically for introduced species that are not yet permanently established. Naturalized species are typically introduced species that can reproduce and maintain self-sustaining populations outside their native range without ongoing human assistance (i.e. they are no longer adventive). The term can also apply to populations that have migrated and become established in a novel environment without direct human introduction; for example, in Europe, house sparrow populations have been well established since the early Iron Age despite originating in Asia. Immigrant species are species that move between habitats, sometimes under their own power but often with unintentional human assistance. Invasiveness is not implied or required.

=== Invasive species ===
Introduction of a species outside its native range is all that is required to be qualified as an "introduced species". Such species might be termed naturalized, "established", or "wild non-native species". If they further spread beyond the place of introduction and cause damage to nearby species, they are called "invasive species". The transition from introduction, to establishment and to invasion has been described in the context of plants. Introduced species are essentially "non-native" species. Invasive species are those introduced species that spread widely or quickly and cause harm, be that to the environment, human health, other valued resources, or the economy. There have been calls from scientists to consider a species "invasive" only in terms of their spread and reproduction rather than the harm they may cause.

According to a practical definition, an invasive species is one that has been introduced and become a pest in its new location, spreading (invading) by natural means. The term is used to imply both a sense of urgency and actual or potential harm. For example, U.S. Executive Order 13112 (1999) defines "invasive species" as "an alien species whose introduction does or is likely to cause economic or environmental harm or harm to human health". Alternatively, they can be defined simply by the fact that they spread beyond the area of original introduction.

From a regulatory perspective, it is neither desirable nor practical to list as undesirable or outright ban all non-native species (although the State of Hawaii has adopted an approach that comes close to this). Regulations require a definitional distinction between non-natives that are deemed especially onerous and all others. Introduced "pest" species, that are officially listed as invasive, best fit the definition of an invasive species. Early detection and rapid response is the most effective strategy for regulating a pest species and reducing economic and environmental impacts of an introduction. Management of invasion pathways are on the forefront of eliminating unwanted invasive species this would include preliminary steps; educating the public, cooperation from industries and government resources.

In Great Britain, the Wildlife and Countryside Act 1981 prevents the introduction of any animal not naturally occurring in the wild or any of a list of both animals or plants introduced previously and proved to be invasive.

== Nature of introductions ==
By definition, a species is considered "introduced" when its transport into an area outside of its native range is human mediated. Introductions by humans can be described as either intentional or accidental. Intentional introductions have been motivated by individuals or groups who either: (1) believe that the newly introduced species will be in some way beneficial to humans in its new location or, (2) species are introduced intentionally but with no regard to the potential impact. Unintentional or accidental introductions are most often a byproduct of human movements and are thus unbound to human motivations. Subsequent range expansion of introduced species may or may not involve human activity.

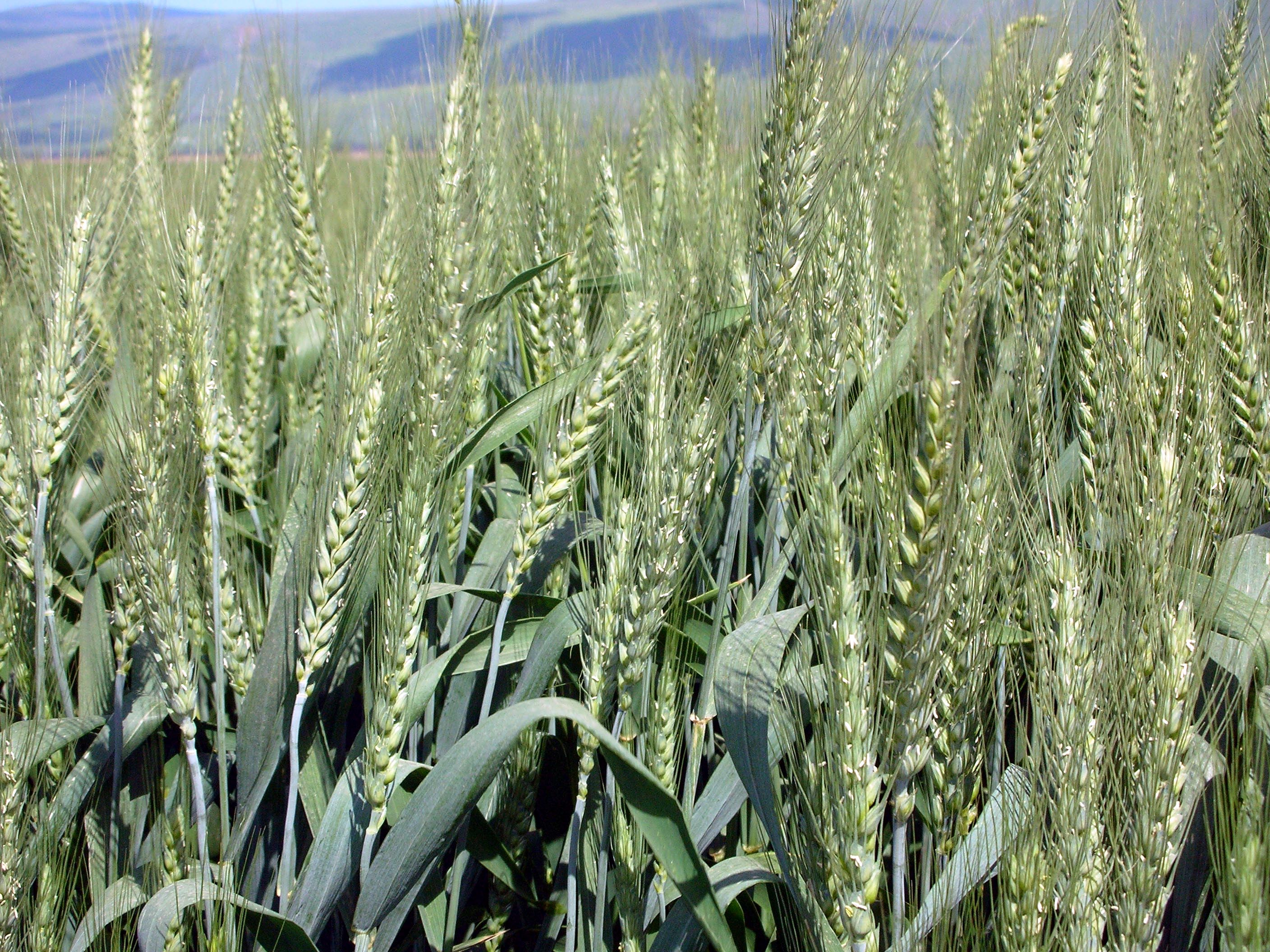
Wheat Triticum introduced worldwide from its place of origin (Mesopotamia)

=== Intentional introductions ===
Species that humans intentionally transport to new regions can subsequently become successfully established in two ways. In the first case, organisms are purposely released for establishment in the wild. It is sometimes difficult to predict whether a species will become established upon release, and if not initially successful, humans have made repeated introductions to improve the probability that the species will survive and eventually reproduce in the wild. In these cases, it is clear that the introduction is directly facilitated by human desires.

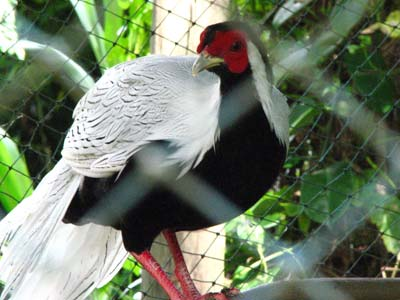
Male silver pheasant

In the second case, species intentionally transported into a new region may escape from captive or cultivated populations and subsequently establish independent breeding populations. Escaped organisms are included in this category because their initial transport to a new region is human motivated.

The widespread phenomena of intentional introduction has also been described as biological globalization.

Positive Introductions

Although most introduced species have negative impacts on the ecosystems they enter into, there are still some species that have affected the ecosystem in a positive way. For example, in New Hampshire invasive plants can provide some benefits to some species. Invasive species such as autumn olive, oriental bittersweet, and honeysuckle produce fruit that is used by a handful of fruit-eating bird species. The invasive plants can also be a source of pollen and nectar for many insects, such as bees. These invasive plants were able to help their ecosystem thriving, and increase the native animal's chances of survival. Several introduced exotic trees served as nest sites for resident waterbird species in Udaipur city, India.

==== Motivations for intentional introductions ====
===== Economic =====
Perhaps the most common motivation for introducing a species into a new place is that of economic gain. Non-native species can become such a common part of an environment, culture, and even diet that little thought is given to their geographic origin. For example, soybeans, kiwi fruit, wheat, honey bees, and all livestock except the American bison and the turkey are non-native species to North America. Collectively, non-native crops and livestock account for 98% of US food. These and other benefits from non-natives are so vast that, according to the Congressional Research Service, they probably exceed the costs.

Other examples of species introduced for the purposes of benefiting agriculture, aquaculture or other economic activities are widespread. Eurasian carp was first introduced to the United States as a potential food source. The apple snail was released in Southeast Asia with the intent that it be used as a protein source, and subsequently to places like Hawaii to establish a food industry. In Alaska, foxes were introduced to many islands to create new populations for the fur trade. About twenty species of African and European dung beetles have established themselves in Australia after deliberate introduction by the Australian Dung Beetle Project in an effort to reduce the impact of livestock manure. The timber industry promoted the introduction of Monterey pine (Pinus radiata) from California to Australia and New Zealand as a commercial timber crop. These examples represent only a small subsample of species that have been moved by humans for economic interests.

The rise in the use of genetically modified organisms has added another potential economic advantage to introducing new/modified species into different environments. Companies such as Monsanto that earn much of their profit through the selling of genetically modified seeds has added to the controversy surrounding introduced species. The effect of genetically modified organisms varies from organism to organism and is still being researched today, however, the rise of genetically modified organisms has added complexity to the conversations surrounding introduced species.

===== Human enjoyment =====
Introductions have also been important in supporting recreation activities or otherwise increasing human enjoyment. Numerous fish and game animals have been introduced for the purposes of sport fishing and hunting. The introduced amphibian (Ambystoma tigrinum) that threatens the endemic California salamander (A. californiense) was introduced to California as a source of bait for fishermen. Pet animals have also been frequently transported into new areas by humans, and their escapes have resulted in several introductions, such as feral cats, parrots, and pond slider.

Lophura nycthemera (silver pheasant), a native of East Asia, has been introduced into parts of Europe for ornamental reasons.

Many plants have been introduced with the intent of aesthetically improving public recreation areas or private properties. The introduced Norway maple for example occupies a prominent status in many of Canada's parks. The transport of ornamental plants for landscaping use has and continues to be a source of many introductions. Some of these species have escaped horticultural control and become invasive. Notable examples include water hyacinth, salt cedar, and purple loosestrife.

In other cases, species have been translocated for reasons of "cultural nostalgia", which refers to instances in which humans who have migrated to new regions have intentionally brought with them familiar organisms. Famous examples include the introduction of common starlings to North America by the American Eugene Schieffelin, a lover of the works of Shakespeare and the chairman of the American Acclimatization Society, who, it is rumoured, wanted to introduce all of the birds mentioned in Shakespeare's plays into the United States. He deliberately released eighty starlings into Central Park in New York City in 1890, and another forty in 1891.

Yet another prominent example of an introduced species that became invasive is the European rabbit in Australia. Thomas Austin, a British landowner, had rabbits released on his estate in Victoria because he missed hunting them. A more recent example is the introduction of the common wall lizard (Podarcis muralis) to North America by a Cincinnati boy, George Rau, around 1950 after a family vacation to Italy.

===== Addressing environmental problems =====
Intentional introductions have also been undertaken with the aim of ameliorating environmental problems. A number of fast spreading plants such as kudzu have been introduced as a means of erosion control. Other species have been introduced as biological control agents to control invasive species. This involves the purposeful introduction of a natural enemy of the target species with the intention of reducing its numbers or controlling its spread.

A special case of introduction is the reintroduction of a species that has become locally endangered or extinct, done in the interests of conservation. Examples of successful reintroductions include wolves to Yellowstone National Park in the U.S., and the red kite to parts of England and Scotland. Introductions or translocations of species have also been proposed in the interest of genetic conservation, which advocates the introduction of new individuals into genetically depauperate populations of endangered or threatened species.

=== Unintentional introductions ===
Unintentional introductions occur when species are transported by human vectors. Increasing rates of human travel are providing accelerating opportunities for species to be accidentally transported into areas in which they are not considered native. For example, three species of rat (the black, Norway and Polynesian) have spread to most of the world as hitchhikers on ships, and arachnids such as scorpions and exotic spiders are sometimes transported to areas far beyond their native range by riding in shipments of tropical fruit. This was seen during the introduction of Steatoda nobilis (Noble false widow) worldwide through banana shipments.

Further there are numerous examples of marine organisms being transported in ballast water, among them the comb jelly Mnemiopsis leidyi, the bacterium Vibrio cholerae, or the zebra mussel. The Mediterranean and Black Seas, with their high volume shipping from exotic sources, are most impacted by this problem. Busy harbors are all potential hotspots as well: over 200 species have been introduced to the San Francisco Bay in this manner making it the most heavily invaded estuary in the world.

There is also the accidental release of the Africanized honey bees (AHB), known colloquially as "killer bees") or Africanized bee to Brazil in 1957 and the Asian carp to the United States. The insect commonly known as the brown marmorated stink bug (Halyomorpha halys) was introduced accidentally in Pennsylvania. Another form of unintentional introductions is when an intentionally introduced plant carries a parasite or herbivore with it. Some become invasive, for example, the oleander aphid, accidentally introduced with the ornamental plant, oleander.

Yet another unintentional pathway of introduction is during the delivery of humanitarian aid in the aftermath of natural disasters. This occurred during relief efforts for Hurricane Maria in Dominica, it was found that the common green iguana, the Cuban tree frog, and potentially the Venezuela snouted tree frog were introduced with the former two becoming established.

Most accidentally or intentionally introduced species do not become invasive as the ones mentioned above. For instance, some 179 coccinellid species have been introduced to the U.S. and Canada; about 27 of these non-native species have become established, and only a handful can be considered invasive, including the intentionally introduced Harmonia axyridis, multicolored Asian lady beetle. However the small percentage of introduced species that become invasive can produce profound ecological changes. In North America, Harmonia axyridis has become the most abundant lady beetle and probably accounts for more observations than all the native lady beetles put together.

Some unintentional introductions have been labelled "self-introductions". These include cases where invasive species bring in their own natural enemies. Such "self-introductions" may help to control the host invaders, or may become pests themselves.

== Introduced plants ==
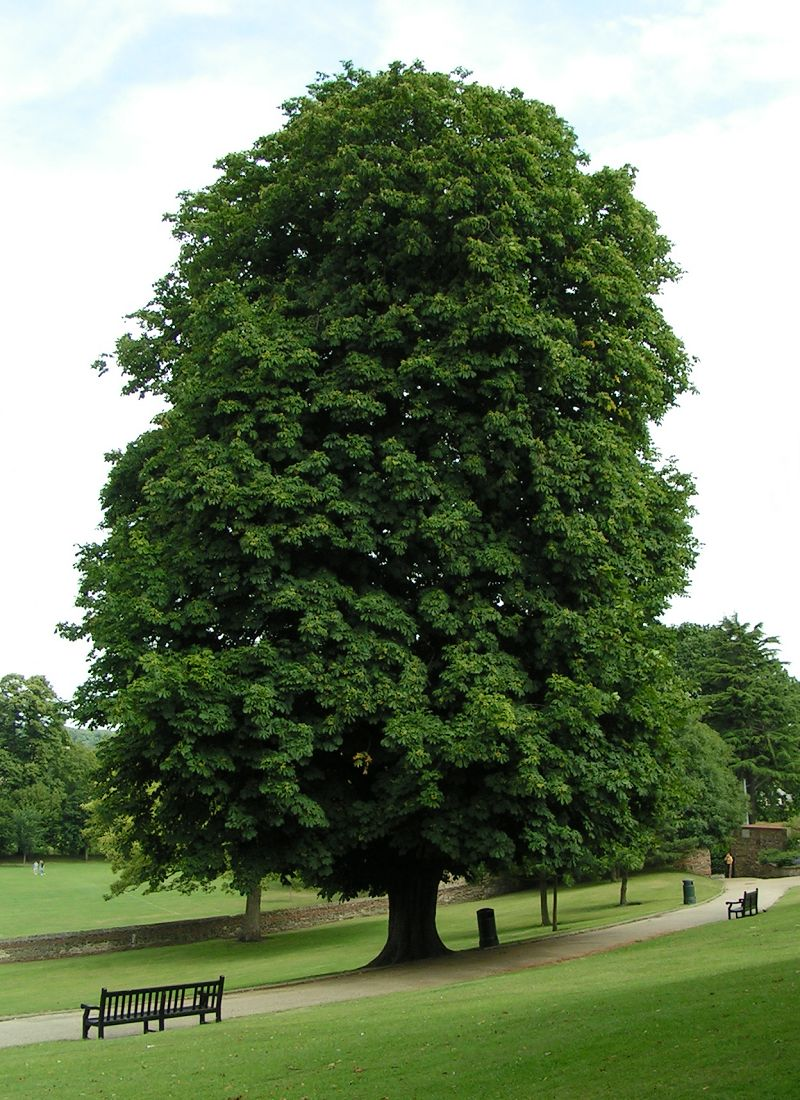
Aesculus hippocastanum, native to Greece and the Balkan peninsula, has been introduced across most of Europe and parts of North America as an ornamental plant.

Many non-native plants have been introduced into new territories, initially as either ornamental plants or for erosion control, stock feed, or forestry. Whether an exotic will become an invasive species is seldom understood in the beginning.

A very troublesome marine species in southern Europe is the seaweed Caulerpa taxifolia. Caulerpa was first observed in the Mediterranean Sea in 1984, off the coast of Monaco. By 1997, it had covered some 50 km^{2}. It has a strong potential to overgrow natural biotopes, and represents a major risk for sublittoral ecosystems. The origin of the alga in the Mediterranean was thought to be either as a migration through the Suez Canal from the Red Sea, or as an accidental introduction from an aquarium.

This species has become invasive in Australia, where it threatens native rare plants and causes erosion and soil slumping around river banks. It has also become invasive in France where it has been listed as an invasive plant species of concern in the Mediterranean region, where it can form monocultures that threaten critical conservation habitats.

== Introduced animals ==
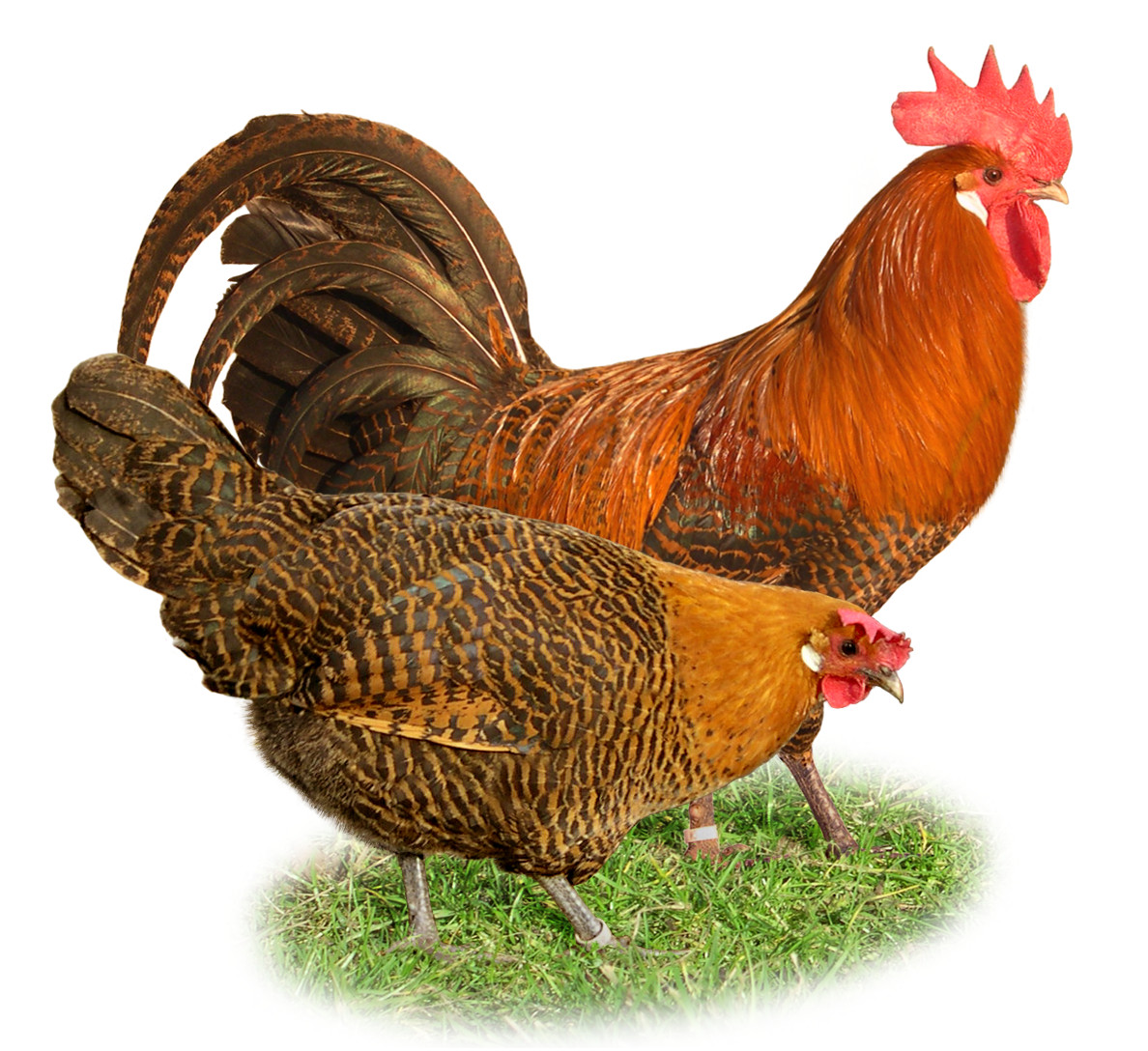
Chickens Gallus gallus domesticus, from Asia, introduced in the rest of the world

Most introduced species do not become invasive. Examples of introduced animals that have become invasive include the gypsy moth in eastern North America, the zebra mussel and alewife in the Great Lakes, the Canada goose and gray squirrel in Europe, the beaver in Tierra del Fuego, the muskrat in Europe and Asia, the cane toad and red fox in Australia, nutria in North America, Eurasia, and Africa, and the common brushtail possum in New Zealand. In Taiwan, the success of introduced bird species was related to their native range size and body size; larger species with larger native range sizes were found to have larger introduced range sizes.

One notoriously devastating introduced species is the small Indian mongoose (Urva auropunctata). Originating in a region encompassing Iran and India, it was introduced to the West Indies and Hawaii in the late 1800s for pest control. Since then, it has thrived on prey unequipped to deal with its speed, nearly leading to the local extinction of a variety of species.

In some cases, introduced animals may unintentionally promote the cause of rewilding. For example, escaped horses and donkeys that have gone feral in the Americas may play ecological roles similar to those of the equids that became extinct there at the end of the Pleistocene.

The exotic pet trade has also been a large source of introduced species. The species favored as pets have more general habitat requirements and larger distributions. Therefore, as these pets escape or are released, unintentionally or intentionally, they are more likely to survive and establish non-native populations in the wild. Among the popular exotic pets that have become alien or invasive species are iguanas, parrots, frogs, and terrapins.

=== Most commonly introduced species ===
Some species, such as the Western honey bee, brown rat, house sparrow, ring-necked pheasant, and European starling, have been introduced very widely. In addition there are some agricultural and pet species that frequently become feral; these include rabbits, dogs, ducks, snakes, goats, fish, pigs, and cats. Many water fleas such as Daphnia, Bosmina and Bythotrephes have introduced around the world, causing dramatic changes in native freshwater ecosystems.

== Genetics ==
When a new species is introduced, the species could potentially breed with members of native species, producing hybrids. The genesis of hybrids can range from having little effect, a negative effect, to having devastating effects on native species. Potential negative effects include hybrids that are less fit for their environment resulting in a population decrease. This was seen in the Atlantic Salmon population when high levels of escape from Atlantic Salmon farms into the wild populations resulted in hybrids that had reduced survival. Potential positive effects include adding to the genetic diversity of the population which can increase the adaptation ability of the population and increase the number of healthy individuals within a population. This was seen in the introduction of guppies in Trinidad to encourage population growth and introduce new alleles into the population. The results of this introduction included increased levels of heterozygosity and a larger population size. Wide-spread introductions of non-native iguanas are causing devastating effects on native Iguana populations in the Caribbean Lesser Antilles, as hybrids appear to have higher fitness than native iguanas, leading to competitive outcompetition and replacement. Numerous populations have already become extinct and hybridization continues to reduce the number of native iguanas on multiple islands.

In plants, introduced species have been observed to undergo rapid evolutionary change to adapt to their new environments, with changes in plant height, size, leaf shape, dispersal ability, reproductive output, vegetative reproduction ability, level of dependence on the mycorrhizal network, and level of phenotype plasticity appearing on timescales of decades to centuries.

== On a planetary body ==
It has been hypothesized that invasive species of microbial life could contaminate a planetary body after the former is introduced by a space probe or spacecraft, either deliberately or unintentionally. It has also been hypothesized that the origin of life on earth is due to introductions of life from other planets billions of years ago, possibly by a sentient race. Projects have been proposed to introduce life to other lifeless but habitable planets in other star systems some time in the future. In preparation for this, projects have been proposed to see if anything is still alive from any of the feces left behind during the six Moon landings from 1969 to 1972.

== See also ==
- Archaeophyte
- Biological dispersal
- Biological hazard
- Colonisation (biology)
- Directed panspermia
- Genetic pollution
- Hemerochory
- Nativar
- Naturalisation (biology)
