= Archaeophyte =

Plant species

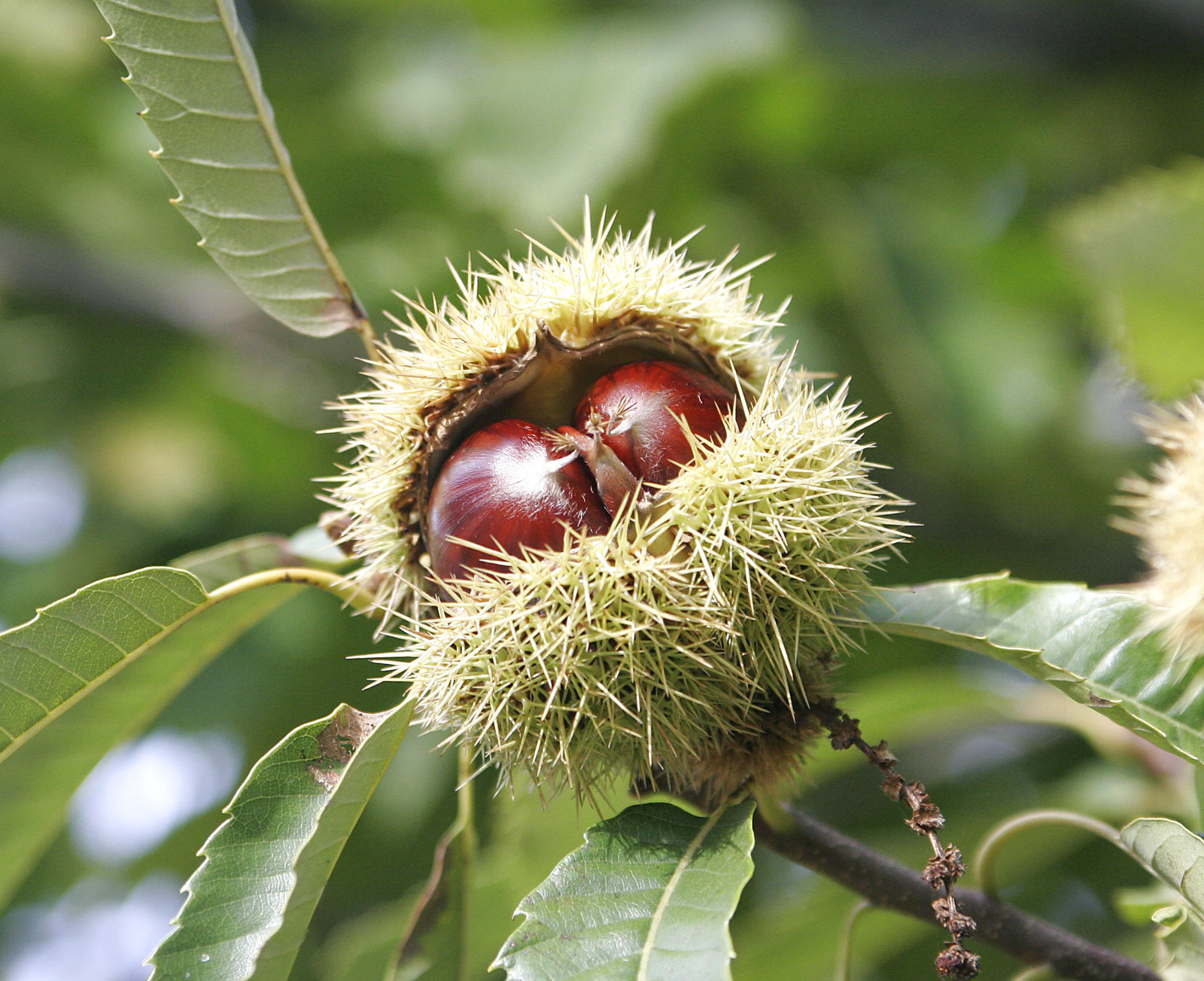
The sweet chestnut (Castanea sativa) was introduced by humans to central and northern Europe in ancient times.

An archaeophyte is a plant species which is non-native to a geographical region, but which was an introduced species in "ancient" times, rather than being a modern introduction. Those arriving after are called neophytes.

The cut-off date is usually the beginning of the early modern period (turn of the 15th or 16th century). In Britain, archaeophytes are considered to be those species first introduced prior to the year 1492, when Christopher Columbus arrived in the New World and the Columbian Exchange began.

== Background ==
Archaeophytes include numerous weed species whose seeds have been found in archaeological excavations – to which they had been brought by people (anthropochory), animals (zoochory) or wind (anemochory).

In some cases, introduced species, whether archaeophytes or neophytes, may have been native species before the ice ages, which extirpated vast numbers of plant species. Central European archaeophytes almost all come from the Mediterranean region and the neighboring areas of Western Asia, as they were introduced into Central Europe with the beginning of agriculture and increasingly since Roman times. They therefore include many familiar plants such as cultivated apples, pears, plums, cereals such as wheat and barley as well as flowers and medicinal plants such as poppy, cornflower, real chamomile and corn.

Australia's collision with the Eurasian Plate led to additional South-east Asian plants entering the Australian flora like the Lepidium and Chenopodioideae. Moreover, Aboriginal Australian and New Guinean contact prior to rising sea levels that isolated Australia from New Guinea in the early Holocene may explain the presence of New Guinea domesticates such as taro (Colocasia esculenta) and bananas (Musa acuminata) in northern Australia. Assisted migrations may also be the reason why some rainforest plants from New Guinea entered northern Australia more than 10,000 years ago.

== Examples ==
Archaeophytes are often cultivated species, transported deliberately by humans, but are also often weeds of cultivation, spread accidentally with grain. Archaeophytes in the United Kingdom include sweet chestnut, wheat, field poppy, flixweed, red valerian, ground elders, soapwort, small toadflax, good king henry and cornflower.

Other examples include:

- Common corn-cockle (Agrostemma githago)
- Common wild oat (Avena fatua)
- Manyseed goosefoot (Lipandra polysperma)
- Sun spurge (Euphorbia helioscopia)
- Green foxtail (Setaria viridis)
- Hairy vetch (Vicia hirsuta)
- Rough corn bedstraw (Galium tricornutum)

== See also ==
- Biogeography
- Chorology
- Glossary of invasion biology terms
- Introduced species
- Invasive species
- List of invasive species
- Hemerochory
- Adventive plant
