= Neophyte (botany) =

Non-native plant species introduced in recent history

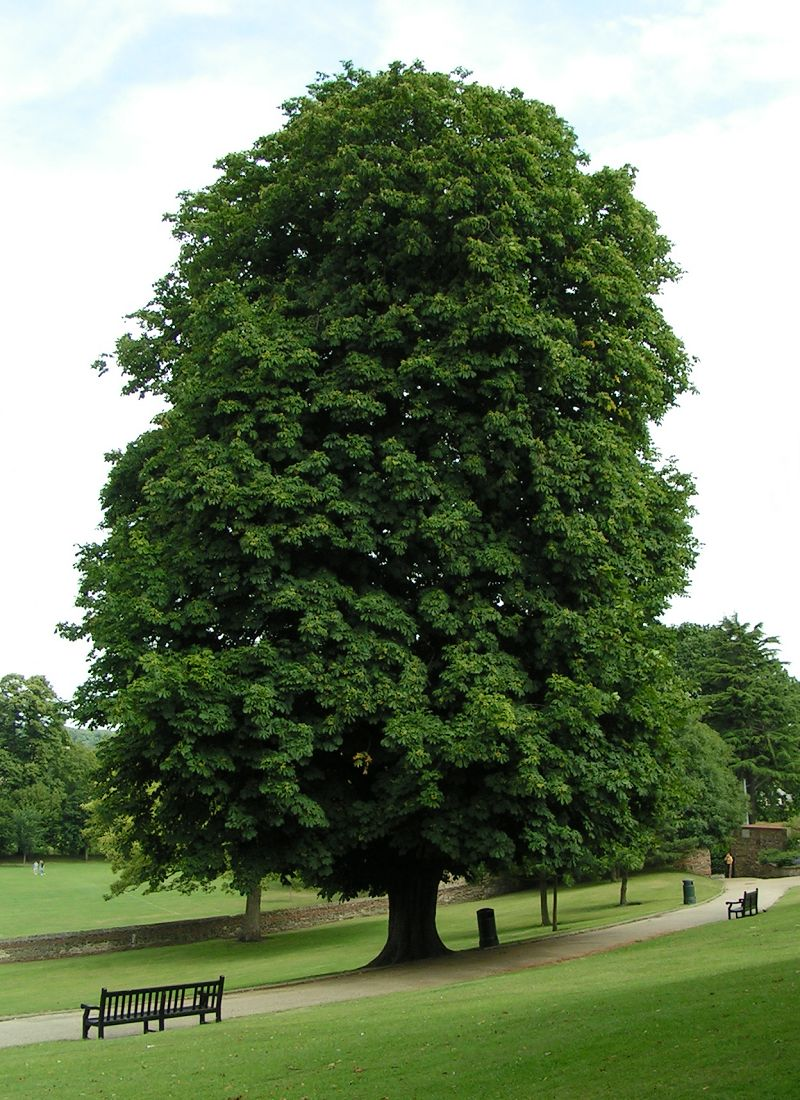
The European horse chestnut (Aesculus hippocastanum) - originally native to the Balkans - is an example of a neophyte species, introduced to the British Isles in the 17th century. It has subsequently been deliberately introduced to numerous other countries around the world.

In botany, a neophyte (from Greek νέος (néos) "new" and φυτόν (phutón) "plant") is a plant species which is not native to a geographical region and was introduced in recent history. Non-native plants that are long-established in an area are called archaeophytes. In Britain, neophytes are defined more specifically as plant species that were introduced after 1492, when Christopher Columbus arrived in the New World and the Columbian Exchange began.

== Terminology ==
The terminology of invasion biology is very uneven. In the English-speaking world, terms such as invasive species or the like are mainly used, which is interpreted differently and do not differentiate between different groups of animals or characteristics of the species. The International Union for Conservation of Nature and Natural Resources (IUCN) differentiates in its definitions between alien species and invasive alien species; alien species are species that have been introduced into a foreign area through human influence. The invasive attribute (invasive) species are assigned that displace native species in their new habitat.

=== Definition ===
In addition to the inconsistency, the xenophobic connotation of invasive and alien was criticized. The neutral designation Neobiota unites all species that have colonized new areas through human influence. However, the terms with neo are not used in a completely uniform way:

- According to one opinion, the terms neobiota or neophytes or neozoa apply regardless of when a species was introduced.
- According to another understanding, these names only apply to species introduced from 1492 onwards. The year of the discovery of America by Columbus was chosen as the border because it marks the beginning of the intensive exchange of living beings between Europe and America. Species that were previously displaced, such as useful plants introduced during the Neolithic Revolution, are called archaeobiota or archaeophytes (plants) or archaeozoa (animals). These terms are mainly used in the German-speaking world.

The term neophyte goes back to the recognized definition by Albert Thellung from 1918, which was later modified many times.

== Biological invasion ==
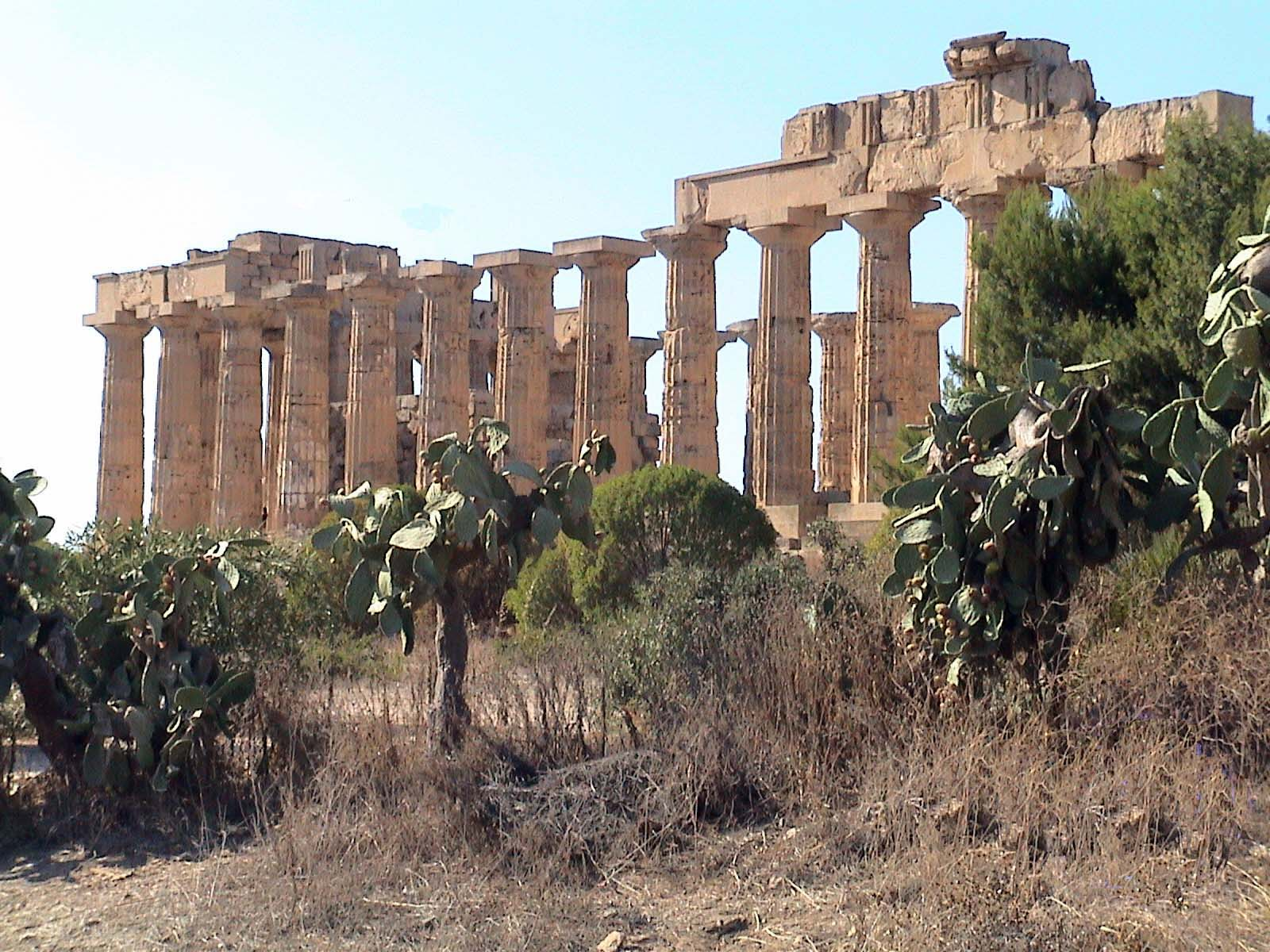
Prickly pears at an ancient Greek temple in Selinunte, Sicily. Native to Mexico and other countries in Central and South America, the prickly pear has been widely cultivated for food; escaped plants have subsequently established populations in several other countries around the world.

One of the most important means of transport for neobiota today is global freight traffic, which enables the unintentional displacement of neobiota. The process of immigration or introduction, establishment and expansion in the new area is called hemerochory or biological invasion. The most important vectors include cargo ships, where neobiota can be hidden in containers or cargo, for example. Aviation also continues to spread neobiota. Distribution via trade routes is mostly unintentional. There is a correlation between economic strength and the number of neobiota at the country level.

Neobiota or neophytes are usually characterized by typical properties such as adaptability, high reproductive rate and often an association with humans. Together with the susceptibility of the new area to biological invaders and the number of displaced individuals, these properties determine the probability of success with which a stable population is established after a spreading event. When humans influence the environment, organisms can spread indirectly and migrate to a new area as neobiota. For example, canal construction enables aquatic life to gain access to a new area. However, it is not always clear whether the species have spread due to anthropogenic environmental changes and are consequently classified as neobiota.

While numerous, neobiota do not cause any noticeable negative effects. Some established neobiota have a strongly negative influence on the biodiversity of their new habitat. The composition of the biocenosis often changes considerably, for example as a result of predation or as a result of competitive pressure. Neobiota can cause economic damage, for example as forest, bank protection and agricultural pests. They can also appear as vectors of pathogens, some of which can also attack crops, livestock and humans. After alien organisms arrive in their new environment, they can become extinct or establish themselves (establish a reproductive population). The success of the establishment depends very much on the properties of the neobiont in question.

== Examples ==
The neophytes include ephemeral plants and newly established species. Ephemeral plants are exotics that have not been established and cannot complete their full life cycle or persist in more than one place over a series of years without direct human assistance. Examples of ephemerophytes in Western and Central Europe are: Common sunflowers, opium poppies, canary grass, tomatoes and adventives or potted main plants. Newly established plants are agriophytes with epecophytes. Examples of newly established species in western and Central Europe are: Sweet flag, Jerusalem artichoke, small balsam, cranberries, horseweed, quickweed, shaggy soldier, German chamomile, slender speedwell, and Persian speedwell.

== See also ==
- Glossary of invasion biology terms
- Introduced species
- Invasive species
- List of invasive species
- Neobiota
- Hemerochory
