= Blue flower colouration =

Chemical structure of delphinidin

Blue flowers are rare in nature, and despite many attempts, blue roses, carnations and chrysanthemums in particular cannot not be produced by conventional breeding techniques. Blue colour in flower petals is caused by delphinidin, a type of anthocyanin, which are a class of flavonoids.

The presence of delphinidin is not enough to produce blue color on its own; It must be in a alkaline environment, form a complex with flavones and metal ions, or some other mechanism.

Blue color has also been produced through breeding with the anthocynanin rosacyanin.

Among gardeners and florists, there exists a colloqial concept known as "true blue", which pertains to flowers that display a pure blue hue and not a black, deep purple, or lavender that could be mistaken for blue.

== Mechanisms ==
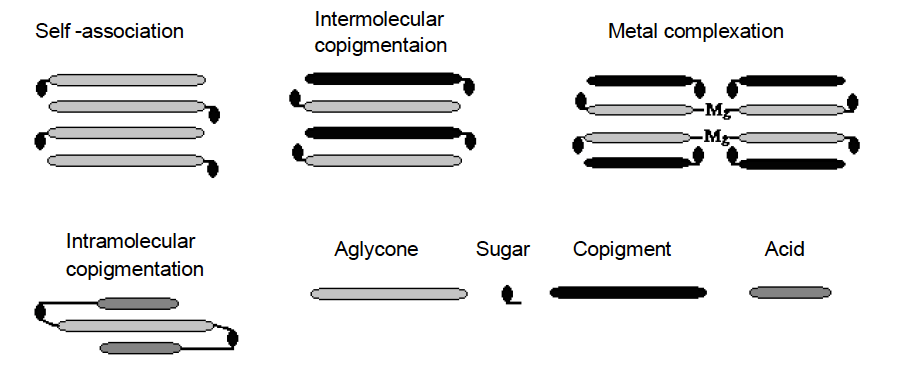
Mechanisms of blue colour formation

Self-association is correlated with the anthocyanin concentration. When concentration is higher we can observe change in the absorbance maximum and increase of colour intensity. Molecules of anthocyanins associate together what results in stronger and darker colour.

Co-pigmentation stabilizes and gives protection to anthocyanins in the complexes. Co-pigments are colourless or have slightly yellow colour. Co-pigments usually are flavonoids (flavones, flavonols, flavanones, flavanols), other polyphenols, alkaloids, amino acids or organic acids. The most efficient co-pigments are flavonols like rutin or quercetin and phenolic acids like sinapic acid or ferulic acid. Association of co-pigment with anthocyanin causes bathochromic effect, shift in absorption maximum to higher wavelength, in result we can observe change of the colour from red to blue. This phenomenon is also called bluing effect. We can diversify two types of co-pigmentation, intermolecular and intramolecular. In the first type co-pigment is bound to anthocyanin by non-covalent bond (hydrogen bond, hydrophobic interaction, ionic interaction). In the second type, we can observe covalent acylation of the glycosyl moiety of anthocyanin. Intramolecular co-pigmentation has stronger effect on the colour. This type of protective stacking is called also a sandwich type stacking and is a very common mechanism in the formation of blue flower colour. Ternatin present in Clitoria ternatea (butterfly pea) and phacelianin present in Phacelia campanularia are examples of pigments with intramolecular co-pigmentation.

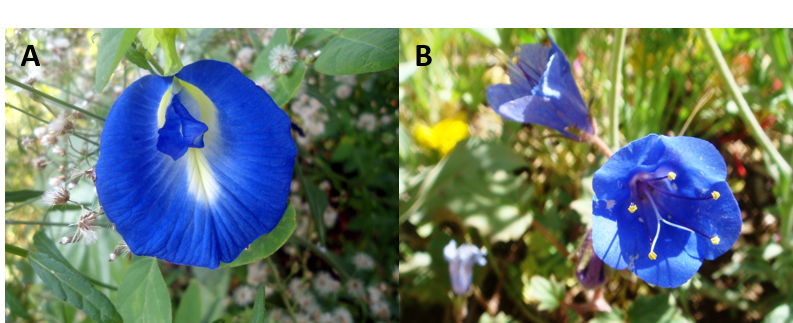
Flower of Clitoria ternatea (left) and Phacelia campanularia (right)

Metal complexation: Often blue flower colour is correlated with presence of anthocyanins in the complexes with metals ions. Metalloanthocyanins are composed from anthocyanins, flavones and metal ions in the stochiometric amounts of 6:6:2, respectively. Typical metals found in anthocyanin complexes are iron (Fe), Magnesium (Mg), aluminium (Al), copper (Cu), potassium (K) and tin (Sn). The only anthocyanins that can form complexes with metal ions are only cyanidin or delphinidin type, because at least two free hydroxyl groups in the B-ring are necessary to be present.

Some flowers such as certain species of Tulipa display blue color only in some petal sections, such as the perianth. In the case of the "Murasakizuisho" variety of Tulipa gesneriana, the blue colored perianths originate from accumulation of iron ions. These iron atoms are likely absorbed early in the plants development. Iron ions may be transported into the vacuole of perianth cells by T. genseriana vacoular iron transporter (TgVit1) activity and complexed for storage in ferritin proteins.

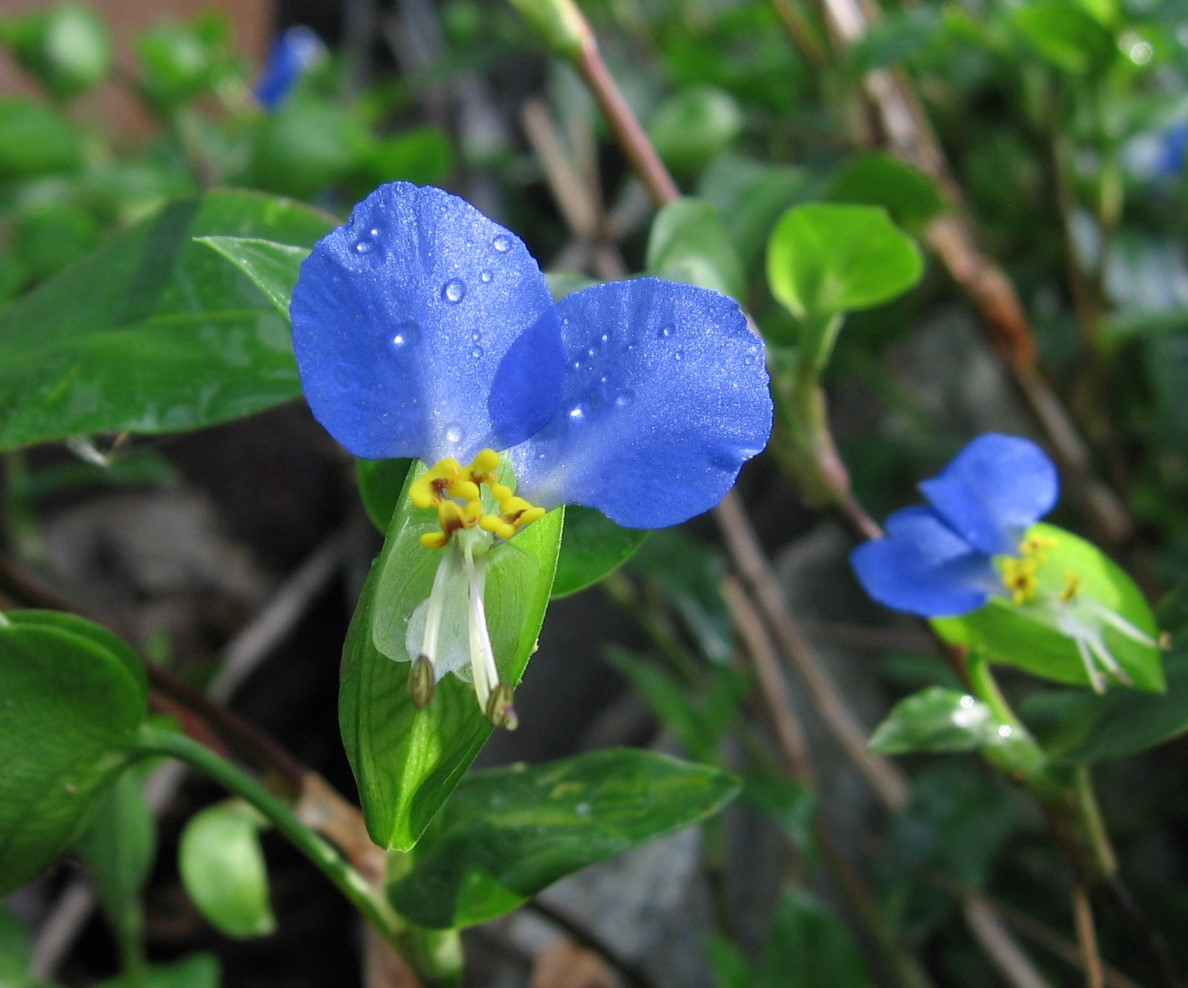
Commelina communis

Examples of metalloanthocyanins: Commelinin isolated from Commelina communis contains malonylawobanin (delphinidin type), flavocommelin (as a co-pigment) and magnesium ions in stochiometric ratio 6:6:2.

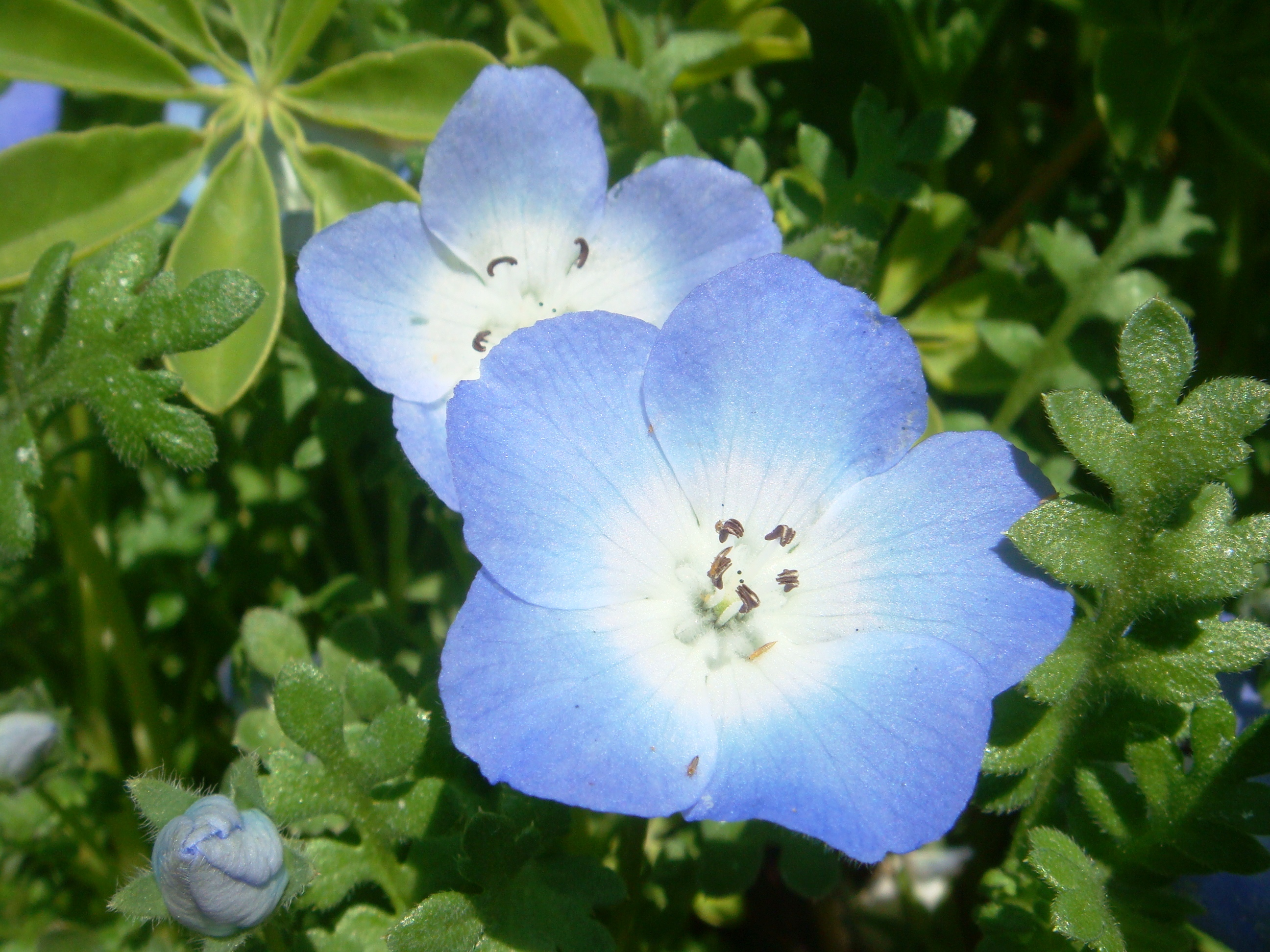
(Nemophila menziesii)

Nemophilin, isolated from Baby Blue Eyes (Nemophila menziesii), is very structurally similar to commelinin, but its anthocyanin is replaced by a petunidin glycoside. Interestingly, the petal color of Nemophila menziesii changes depending on the metal cation complexed with nemophilin. Complexes with primarily magnesium seem to result in a purple-blue hue in comparison to a mixture of magnesium and iron, which results in a blue color.

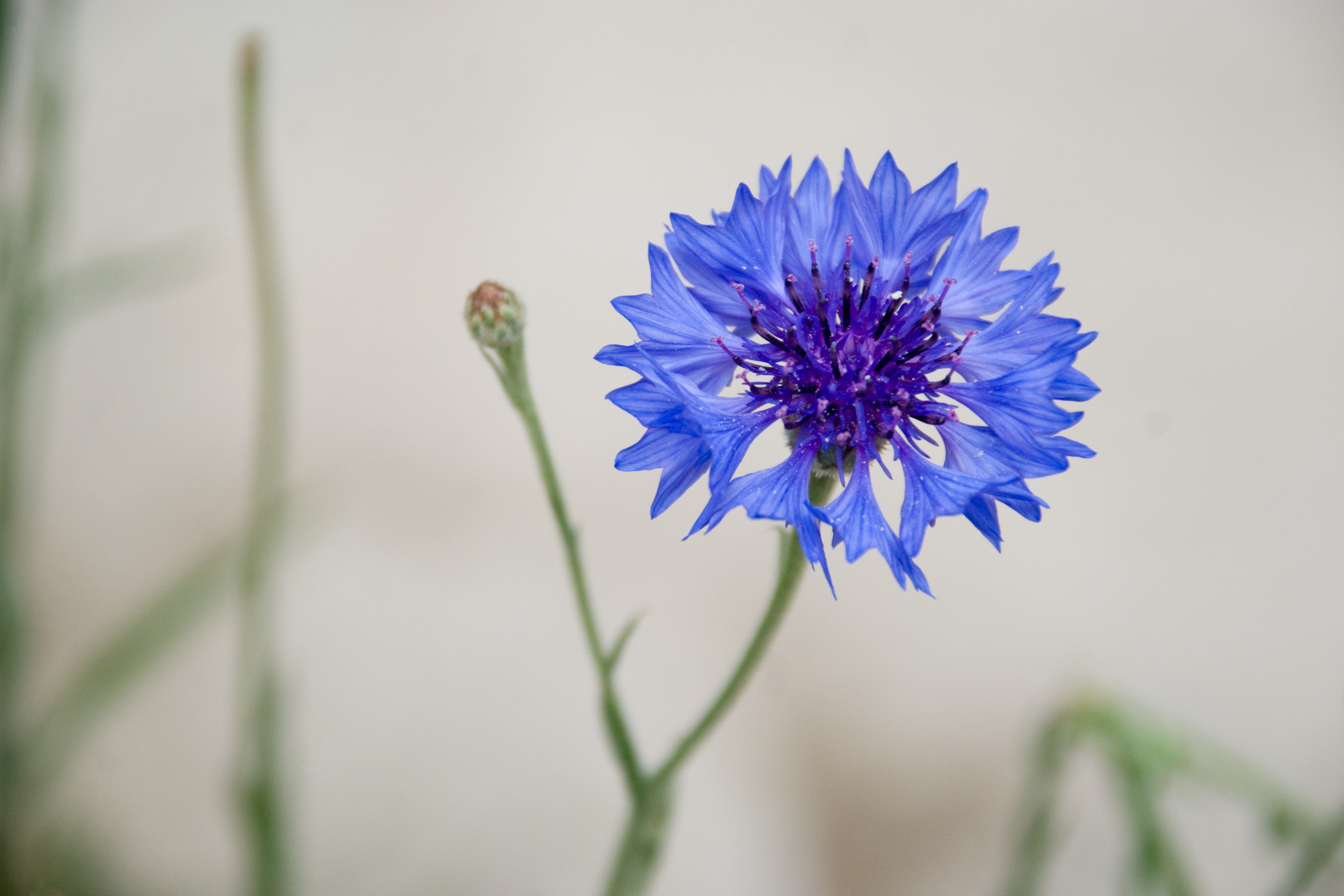
Cornflower (Centaurea cyanus)

Protocyanin is a blue pigment of cornflower (Centaurea cyanus). It is composed from succinylcyanin (anthocyanin), malonylflavone (co-pigment), iron and magnesium anions, and two calcium ions to stabilize the complex. Interestingly, when not in complex with metal ions, it is the same anthocyanin present in red rose petals .

Fuzzy metal complex pigments: In the blue coloured flowers, much often instead than metalloanthocyanins we can find non – stoichiometric metal – complex pigments stabilized by co-pigmentation. Those pigments show blue colour only in aqueous solution and are less stable than metalloanthocyanins. Example of this kind of pigment is present in hydrangea sepals. Main anthocyanin here is delphinidin-3-glucoside what should result in the blue flower formation, but cultivars with red and pink flowers are also present. It is known that acidification of soil can cause change of the hydrangea flower colour from red/pink to blue/violet. Explanation of this phenomenon we can find in the molar ratio of co-pigment (acylquninic acid) to anthocyanin, which is much higher in the blue cells, also the level of Al3+ ions is higher in the blue flowers. Additionally, the pH of blue cell is around 4,1 and red is lower around 3,3. This supramolecule is relatively unstable and easily can fall apart in result of change of component concentration or pH conditions, so this can explain why blue colour in hydrangea sepals has low stability.

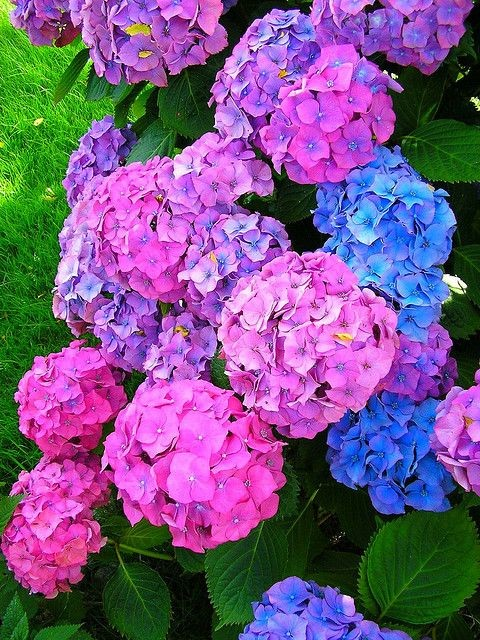
Hydrangea with different flower colours

Vacuolar pH influence on flower colour: pH theory was the first concept, that tried to explain the mystery of blue colour formation in flower petals. First observation showed that cyanine extracted from blue cornflower changes the colour in aqueous solution in different pH. In the acidic range pigment was red but in alkaline solution was blue. It leads to conclusion that increase of pH in cell vacuole should cause increase of blue coloration. This phenomenon we can observe in the morning glory (Ipomoea tricolor) and Japanese blue morning glory (Ipomoea nil) petals. During the flower development we can observe change of the flower colour form purple to blue. Morning glory has just one delphinidin type anthocyanin and the composition of it does not change during the flower development, but change of the colour is caused by increase of pH in vacuole of coloured cells from 6.6 in buds to 7.7 in fully matured flowers. During the early stage of development acidic pH is maintained by proton pumps, on the latter stage K+/H+ exchanger is responsible for vacuole alkalization.

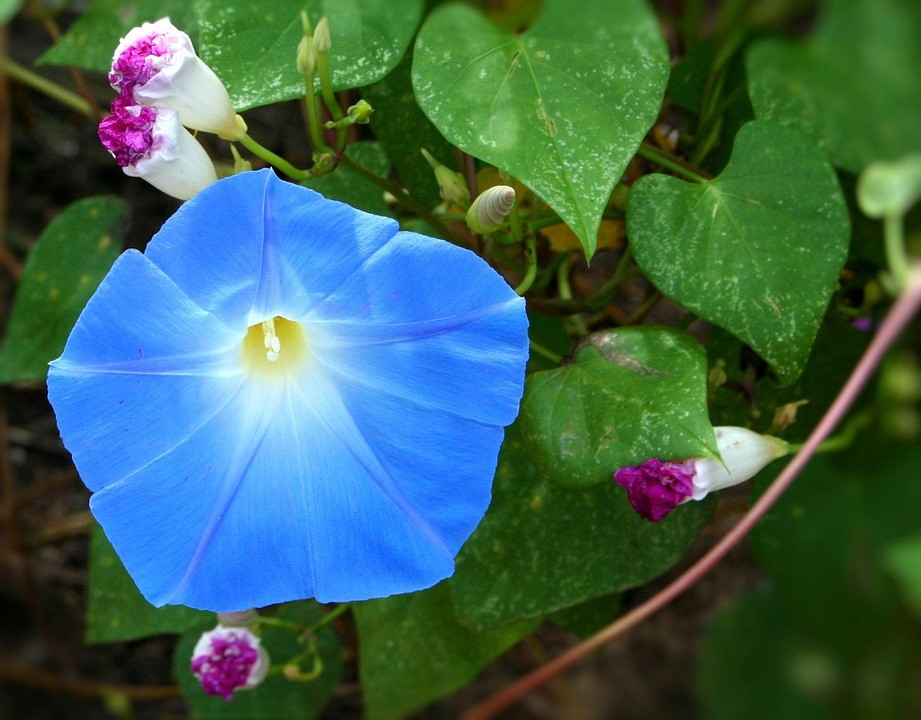
Morning glory (Ipomoea tricolor) with different stages of flower development, buds have pink colour when matured flower are blue

== Molecular basis ==
The anthocyanin biosynthesis pathway is now well known and most of the enzymes are characterized. In the formation of blue pigments a few enzymes have particularly important roles, in particular flavonoid 3'5'-hydroxylase (F3'5'H) and dihydroflavonol 4-reductase (DFR).

The flavonoid 3'5'H-hydroxylase is responsible for the introduction of the second and third hydroxyl group in the B-ring of dihydrokaempferol (DHK) or naringenin which are regarded as the main substrates of the reaction. Product of the reaction with DHK is dihydromyricetin (DHM), precursor for synthesis of all delphinidin type anthocyanin. Enzyme is a member of cytochrome P450 protein family (P450s). It is a very diverse group of heme-containing oxidases, which catalyze NADPH- or NADH-dependent oxidation. F3'5'H was classified into CYP75A subfamily. This enzyme appears to be the primary route for blue pigment formation in many plants. Furthermore, interference with F3'5'H expression in plants that natively produce it results in a shift in flower color from purple/blue to red/orange hues

Dihydroflavonol 4-reductase is the oxidoreductase that catalyzes in the presence of NADPH the stereospecific reduction of the keto group in position 4 of dihydroflavonols producing colourless leucoanthocyanidins as a precursor for anthocyanin formation. Enzyme can show substrate specificity with respect to the B-ring hydroxylation pattern of the dihydroflavonol and can therefore have an influence on the type of formed anthocyanin. For the blue pigment formation, necessary is enzyme, which accept dihydromyricetin (DHM) as a substrate. Product of DFR reaction with DHM in the following steps of the pathway is converted to delphinidin type blue pigments.

== Cultivation ==
In some very economically important flowers like roses, carnations and chrysanthemums despite a lot of efforts was not possible to breed the flowers with blue petals coloration. The lack of F3'5'H enzyme and hence delphinidin type anthocyanin is the reason why blue flower colour was not possible to obtain.

=== Blue carnations ===
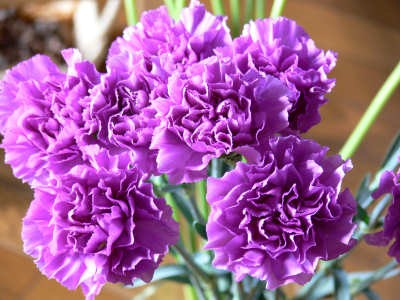
Purple carnation cultivar

Delphinidin accumulating carnations (Dianthus caryophyllus) were obtained by overexpression of petunia F3'5'H and DFR in the cultivars, without endogenous DFR activity. As a result, a few cultivars with different purple hue of the flowers were generated.

Blue Chrysanthemums

Strategies built on using genetic engineering to introduce F3'5'H and therefore blue pigments into chrysanthemums have also led to notable results, with recent work in transgenic chrysanthemums resulting in what may be the first transgenic "true blue" flower development in plants that are F3'5'H-negative.

Work in chrysanthemums has shown that not all F3'5'H genes and promoters have the same capacity for delphinidin production when provided through genetic engineering. Overexpression of Campanula F3'5'H however, results in dramatic production of delphinidin in chrysanthemum, resulting in a novel purple phenotype similar to what had been seen in chrysanthemum and roses.

True blue flower presentation in chrysanthemums has been genetically engineered through the introduction of the butterfly pea UDP-glucose:anthocyanin 3',5'-O-glucosyltransferase (UA3'5'GT) gene, which allows for production of blue-appearing ternatins from F3'5'H-produced delphinidins. This is C5 ternatin, the simplest ternatin, which is further modified to form other ternatin derivatives. Modifications made to delphinidin in the derivation of ternatins allow for stacking, contributing to a more stable blue color.

=== Blue roses ===
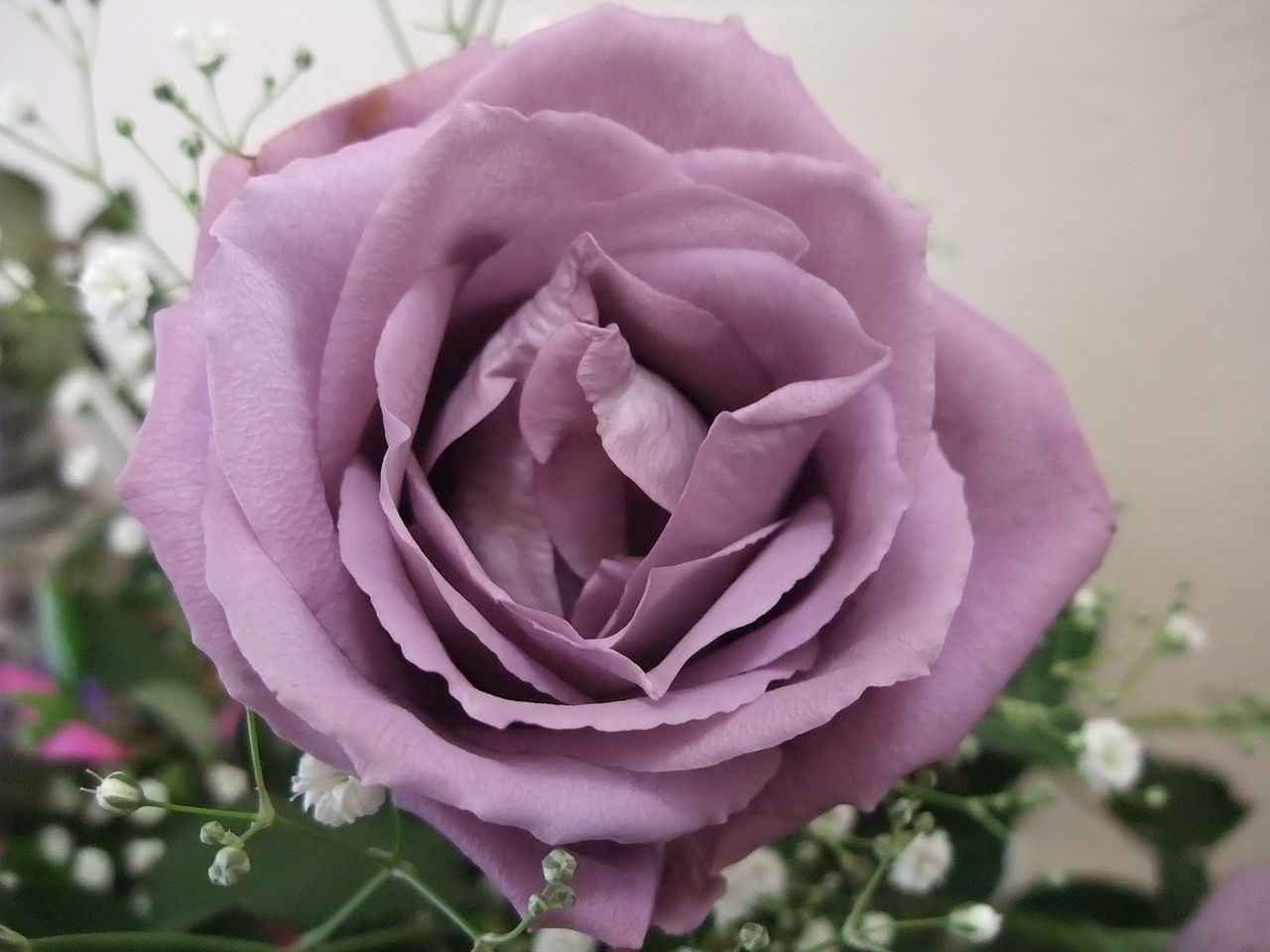
Blue rose cultivar "Applause"

Roses are especially difficult to obtain blue/violet flower colour. Lack of F3'5'H and unfavourable vacuole pH were the main obstacles. A lot of cultivars were screened to choose the proper one for genetic modification. Finally, flowers with violet/blue hues were obtained by overexpression of viola F3'5'H, down regulation of endogenous DFR and at the same time overexpression of iris (Iris x hollandica) DFR. As the result of those modifications flowers accumulate almost exclusively delphinidin type pigments in the petals.

Additionally, hybridizers throughout the history of rose cultivation have made several strides toward producing rose varieties with colors in the lavender, violet, and mauve color families.

These colors were the height of fashion especially in the late 1800s, when the industrial revolution made synthetic color pigments inexpensive and widely available for the first time. Bright shades of royal purple, mauve, and blue naturally became extremely popular and fashionable because these colors previously were only available to extremely wealthy people. The pigments to create these colors were previously very scarce.

Several classes of garden rose were created with magenta and violet flowers during this time period to reflect the growing trend in popularity of these previously luxurious and rare colors.

Notable examples of popular historical roses which are still grown today by rosarians include the gallica rose 'Cardinal de Richelui'; the hybrid perpetual 'Reine des violettes', and the setigera rambler rose 'Veilchenblau'.

Their violet flower colors are due to complexes of cyanidin with sugar molecules, metal complexes, and tannins naturally present in the flower petals.

In the early 1900s, a new species of rose called Rosa foetida 'bicolor' was introduced into world commerce from the middle east. It has flowers which are bright shades of butter yellow, orange, and velvety blood red, which introduced new genetic traits that serendipitously and coincidentally created a pathway toward new lavender and blue pigments that are independent of delphinidin, a blue pigment not naturally found in roses. That pathway involves the final stages of flavanoid pigment synthesis which would normally cause flowers to appear yellow or orange. This new species carried small traces of unused genes that allowed production of another type of blue pigment called rosacyanin, which most roses evolved to stop utilizing in favor of producing flower fragrances to attract pollinators. The structure of rosacyanin was described in 2002.

Rosacyanin allows roses to come in delicate mauve and lavender. These colors can be seen in the hybrid tea roses 'Sterling Silver', 'Blue Girl', and 'Blue Moon', among others, which descend from yellow roses. Most notably a popular yellow hybrid tea rose called 'Peace', which was named to commemorate the end of World War II, was used extensively in hybridizing, and fathered most of the original lavender hybrid teas.

In 2004, Japanese company Suntory produced a blue rose, named Applause.

Further hybridizing advancements, scientific study, and possibly further genetic engineering will be necessary to concentrate these natural genetic factors and cofactors before roses will be able to come in deep shades of true blue.

== See also ==
- Blue flower
- Pterobilin - a blue pigment of animal origin
