= Pterobilin =

Identifiers
CAS Number	20890-42-0
3D model (JSmol)	Interactive image
ChemSpider	4952646
PubChem CID	5287802
UNII	ZEK8SD9LJN
- InChI: InChI=1S/C23H21N3O2S2/c1-15-3-5-19(16(2)11-15)20-14-30-23(26-20)29-13-18-4-6-21(28-18)22(27)25-12-17-7-9-24-10-8-17/h3-11,14H,12-13H2,1-2H3,(H,25,27) Key: QWUAUCVIVCXEEL-UHFFFAOYSA-N
- SMILES: CC1=C(CCC(=O)O)\C(=C\c2[nH]c(\C=C/3\N=C(\C=C\4/NC(=O)C(=C4C)CCC(=O)O)C(=C3C)C=C)c(C=C)c2C)\NC1=O

Properties
Chemical formula	C_{33}H_{34}N_{4}O_{6}
Molar mass	582.657 g·mol^{−1}
Density	1.3±0.1 g/cm^{3}
- Except where otherwise noted, data are given for materials in their standard state (at 25 °C [77 °F], 100 kPa). Infobox references

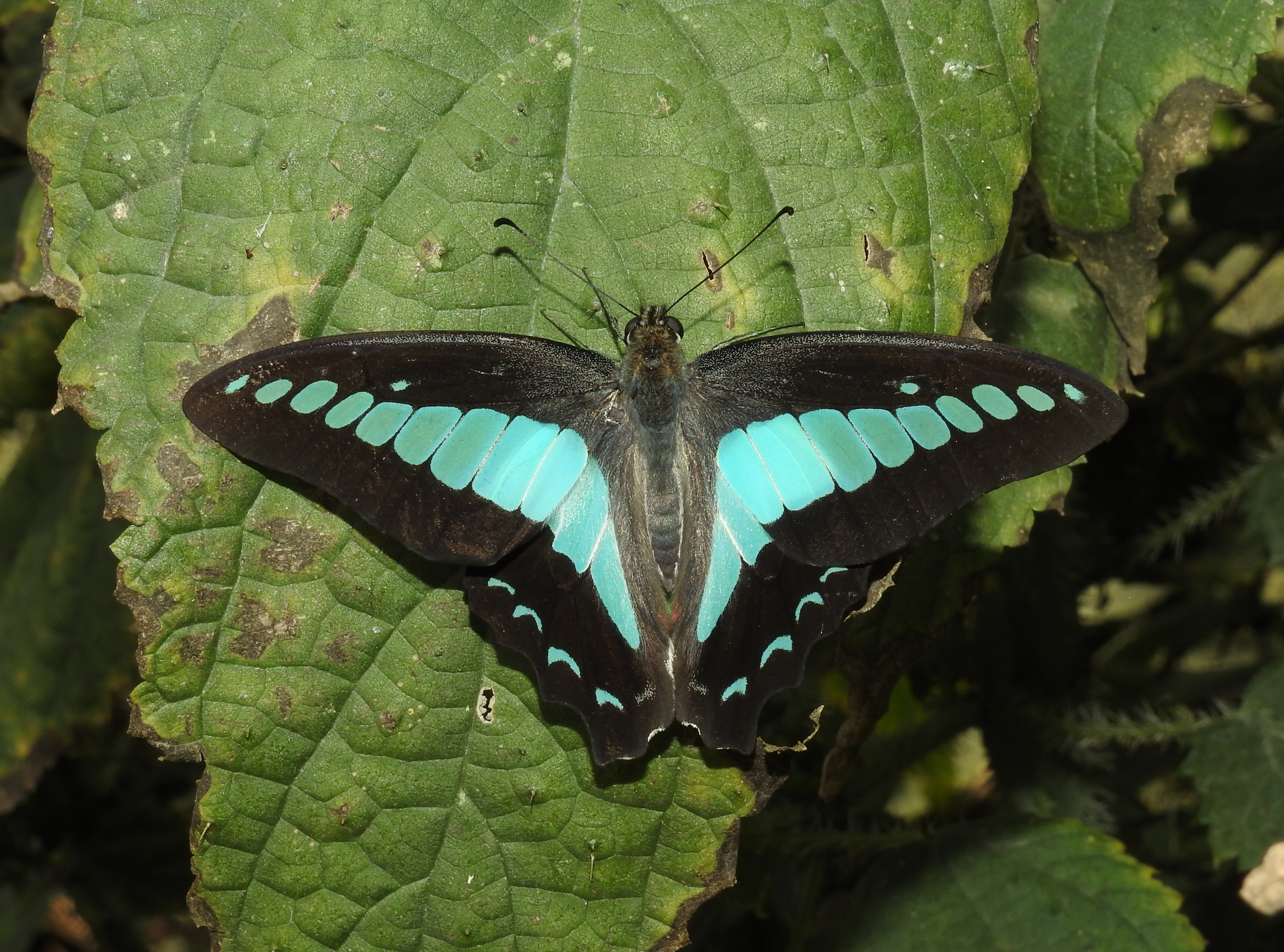
Graphium sarpedon which contains pterobilin

Pterobilin also called biliverdin IXγ in the Fischer nomenclature, is a blue bile pigment found in Nessaea spp., Graphium agamemnon, G. antiphates, G. doson, and G. sarpedon. It is one of only a few blue pigments found in any animal species, as most animals use structural coloration to create blue coloration. Other blue pigments of animal origin include phorcabilin, used by other butterflies in Graphium and Papilio (specifically P. phorcas and P. weiskei), and sarpedobilin, which is used by Graphium sarpedon.

== Synthetic pathways ==
Pterobilin is a chemical precursor to sarpedobilin in the larvae of the fourth instar of G. sarpedon through a double cyclisation of the central vinyl groups of the adjacent nitrogens. In the butterfly species Pieris brassicae, it is produced starting with acetate and then proceeding to glycin, then δ-aminolevulinic acid, then coproporphyrinogen III, to protoporphyrin IX and finally into pterobilin.

Pterobilin can be phototransformed into phorcabilin and sarpedobilin in vitro. Pterobilin can also be thermally rearranged in vitro into phorcabilin.

== Biochemical roles ==
Pterobilin in P. brassicae is thought to play a role in photoreception for the different instars for metering diapause. In adult P. brassicae butterflies the compound is thought to have a role in heat transfer, as the wing scales where pterobilin accumulates differ morphologically in a way that would facilitate photoreception.

== See also ==
- Basics of blue flower colouration
- Biliverdin
