= Blue flower =

Symbol and motif in Western art

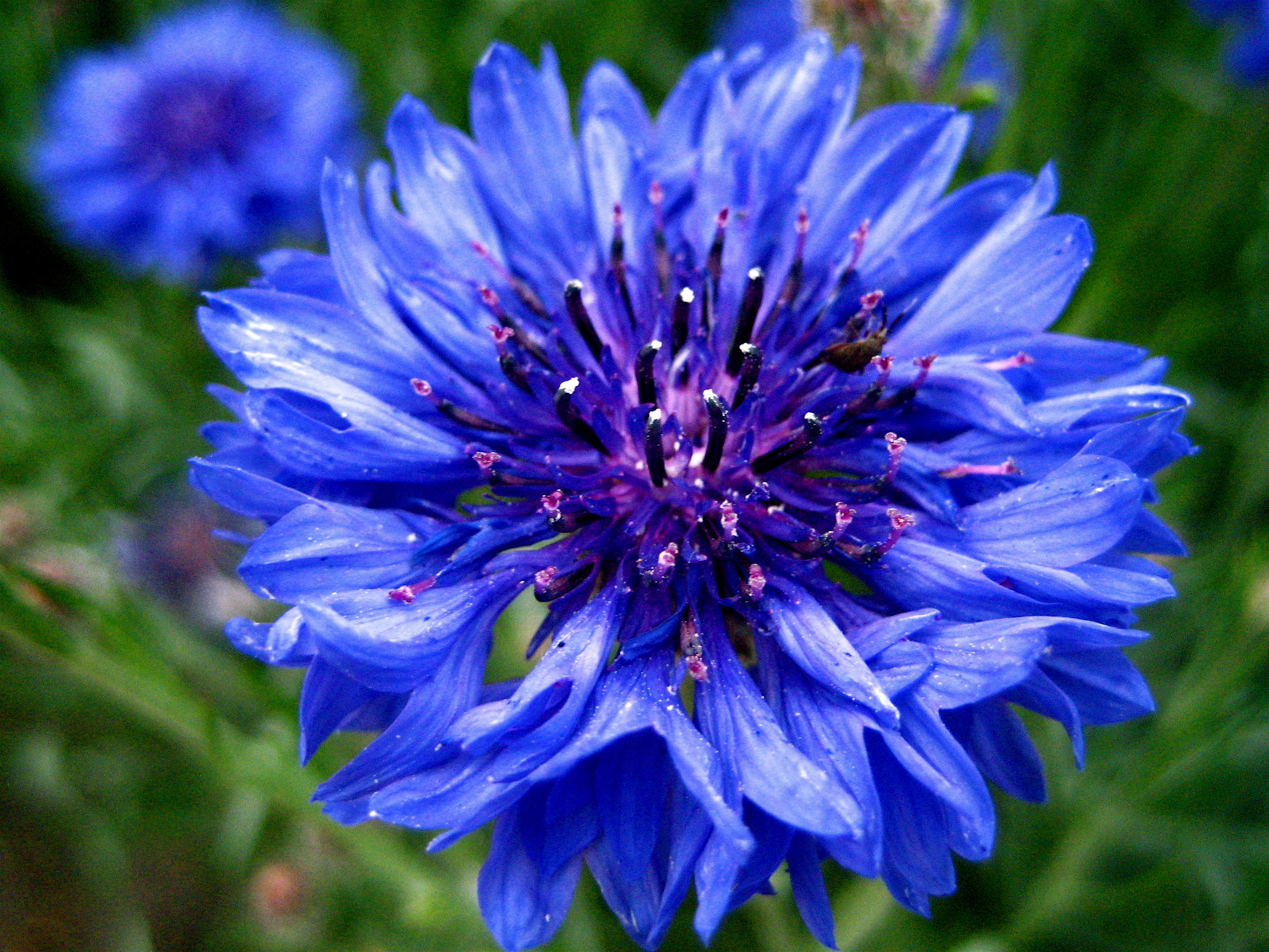
Centaurea cyanus, a common flower in Saxony, where the Romantic writer, Novalis, lived

A blue flower (German: Blaue Blume) was a central symbol of inspiration for the Romanticism movement, and remains an enduring motif in Western art today. It stands for desire, love, and the metaphysical striving for the infinite and unreachable. It symbolizes hope and the beauty of things.

== Early use of the symbol ==
German author Novalis introduced the symbol into the Romantic movement through his unfinished coming-of-age story, entitled Heinrich von Ofterdingen. After contemplating a meeting with a stranger, the young Heinrich von Ofterdingen dreams about a blue flower which calls to him and absorbs his attention.

== Explanation of the symbol ==
"This blue flower is the watchword and sacred symbol of the [Romantic] school," according to H.H. Boyesen. "It is meant to symbolize the deep and sacred longings of a poet's soul. Romantic poetry invariably deals with longing; not a definite, formulated desire for some obtainable object, but a dim, mysterious aspiration, a trembling unrest, a vague sense of kinship with the infinite, and a consequent dissatisfaction with every form of happiness which the world has to offer." Thomas Carlyle offered this, that the blue flower "being Poetry, the real object, passion and vocation of young Heinrich, which, through manifold adventures, exertions and sufferings, he is to seek and find."

== Use of the symbol ==
Joseph Freiherr von Eichendorff wrote a poem called Die blaue Blume (The blue flower). Adelbert von Chamisso saw the core of Romanticism in the motif, and Goethe searched for the "Urpflanze" or "original plant" in Italy, which in some interpretations could refer to the blue flower. E. T. A. Hoffmann used the Blue Flower as a symbol for the poetry of Novalis and the "holy miracle of nature" in his short tale "Nachricht von den neuesten Schicksalen des Hundes Berganza".

In 1902, Charles Scribner's Sons published The Blue Flower, a collection of short stories by Henry Van Dyke, the first two of which, "The Blue Flower" and "The Source", refer to the blue flower as a symbol of desire and hope, and the object of the narrator's search.

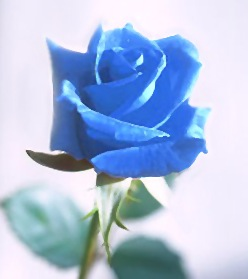
Blue rose

Walter Benjamin used the image of the blue flower several times in his writing. For example, the opening sentence of his essay Dream Kitsch: "No one really dreams any longer of the Blue Flower. Whoever awakes as Heinrich von Ofterdingen today must have overslept." Also in his Work of Art essay: "The equipment-free aspect of reality has here become the height of artifice, and the vision of immediate reality the Blue Flower in the land of technology."

C. S. Lewis, in his autobiographical book Surprised by Joy, references the "Blue Flower" when speaking of the feelings of longing that beauty elicited when he was a child of six. He associates it with the German word sehnsucht, and states that this intense longing for things transcendent made him "a votary of the Blue Flower."

English writer Penelope Fitzgerald's historical novel The Blue Flower is based on Novalis's early life. In John le Carré's 1968 novel A Small Town in Germany, the character Bradfield says, "I used to think I was a Romantic, always looking for the blue flower" (Pan edition, p. 286 – chap. 17). Substance D, a fictitious drug in Philip K. Dick's 1977 novel A Scanner Darkly, is derived from a plant with blue flower.

Tennessee Williams used images of blue roses in his play The Glass Menagerie to symbolize the frailty and uniqueness of Laura, a central character that reflects the life of Williams' sister, who underwent a lobotomy. In the play, Laura is nicknamed "Blue Roses" after another character misheard her say "pleurosis".

In 1972 German band Slapp Happy released the song "Blue Flower" off of their album Sort Of, which was subsequently covered in 1990 by the alternative rock band Mazzy Star on their album She Hangs Brightly and in 1992 by the shoegaze band Pale Saints on the US and Japanese releases of their In Ribbons album.

The folk/pop/narrative band The Gray Havens released an album in 2021 titled “Blue Flower,” inspired by C. S. Lewis’s Surprised By Joy.

In his fantasy series A Song of Ice and Fire, American author George R. R. Martin uses the blue flower as a reoccurring symbol to represent young women of the noble House Stark, often with hints to an illicit love affair. In one instance, Prince Rhaegar Targaryen uses blue winter roses to crown the Lady Lyanna Stark as the "Queen of Love and Beauty" at the Tournament of Harrenhal, passing over his own wife, Princess Elia of Dorne.

The colloquial French expression fleur bleue (blue flower) describes a person who is a sensitive dreamer or ingénue.

The color blue applied to a flower means an unavowed tenderness or an emotion of purity, sincerity, gentleness, sensitivity, and discretion.

=== Wandervogel movement ===
In 1960 Werner Helwig published the book The Blue Flower of the Wandervogel (Die blaue Blume des Wandervogels), a history of the youth movement. Within the movement, a number of folk songs used the motif.

=== The German student movement of the '60s ===
In the 1960s, the German Left reacted against Novalis's imaginary blaue blume, which had become a symbol of Romanticism and bourgeois high culture. The student's chant was "Schlagt die Germanistik tot, färbt die blaue Blume rot!" ("Strike Germanistics dead, color the blue flower red!").

=== Use in modern literature and media ===
David Lynch uses the symbol of the blue flower in the 2010 short film Lady Blue Shanghai, a 16-minute, promotional short film for fashion designer Dior starring Marion Cotillard, among others. In the film a blue flower is hidden in a Dior handbag, at first feared and finally embraced by the female protagonist. It may be said that Lynch is associating the handbag with "divine" inspiration and creativity.

Stanley Kubrick made use of the Blue Flower in his final film, Eyes Wide Shut. Sandor Szavost (Sky Dumont) is wearing one while dancing with Alice Harford (Nicole Kidman).

In the prequel to David Lynch's television series Twin Peaks, entitled Twin Peaks: Fire Walk with Me, two FBI agents are informed about their upcoming task through a woman named Lil. On her lapel is a tiny, artificial blue rose, clearly symbolic of something; but when Sam asks, Chet simply replies, "But I can't tell you about that."

Blue flower is featured in the 2005 film Batman Begins. In it, a fear-intensifying hallucinogenic drug is manufactured from blue flowers. The drug is used by Ra's al Ghul and Dr. Jonathan Crane (the Scarecrow), who plan to terrorize Gotham City by weaponizing the drug into a concentrated powder form and release it into the city's water supply.

Blue flower is again used as the source of a fictitious mind-altering drug, here called Substance D, in the 2006 adaptation of Philip K. Dick's novel A Scanner Darkly.

A display of blue Baptisia australis flowers is used as a symbol of private support for an annual night of extrajudicial killings that serves as the central plot device of 2013 motion picture The Purge.

James and Ruth Bauer, husband and wife collaborative team, wrote an unconventional music theatre piece entitled The Blue Flower at the turn of the 21st century. Speaking through liberally fictionalized versions of artists Max Beckmann, Franz Marc, and Hannah Höch as well as pivotal female scientific figure Marie Curie, the piece works with the romantic significance of the blue flower as it meditates on the brutal political and cultural turmoil of World War I, the short lived Weimar Republic, and Adolf Hitler's rise to power in the Nazi Party.

A 2012 episode of the BBC television series New Tricks, entitled "Blue Flower", concerns the murder of an East German refugee who had been involved in the Blue Flower organisation.

Blue flower is used in the 2016 film Zootopia. In it, the flowers are called "night howlers" and are the source of a drug that causes mammals to become savage and attack anyone who comes near.

The Gray Havens wrote an album titled "Blue Flower", reflecting this metaphor. The songs revolve around the belief of an infinite, powerful, love of God within Christianity.

Released in 1996, Blue Flowers is the second single from Dr Octagonecologyst, Kool Keith's debut studio album.

== See also ==
- Blue rose
- Fern flower
- Basics of blue flower colouration
