= Protocyanin =

Anthocyanin pigment

Protocyanin is an anthocyanin pigment that is responsible for the red colouration of roses, but in cornflowers is blue. The pigment was first isolated in 1913 from the blue cornflower (Centaurea cyanus), and the identical pigment was isolated from a red rose in 1915. The difference in colour had been explained as a difference in flower-petal pH, but the pigment in the blue cornflower has been shown to be a supermolecular pigment consisting of anthocyanin, flavone, one ferric ion, one magnesium and two calcium ions forming a copigmentation complex.

The molecular formula of protocyanin complex is of the type of C_{366}H_{384}O_{228}FeMg.
