= Ghost of a King =

Studio album by The Gray Havens
- Released: April 8, 2016
- Recorded: The Beehive in Nashville, Tennessee
- Genre: Worship; Christian pop; Christian rock
- Length: 37:42
- Label: Artist Garden
- Producer: Ben Shive; Will Chapman

The Gray Havens chronology
Fire and Stone (2015)	Ghost of a King (2016)

Ghost of a King is the second studio album by The Gray Havens. Artist Garden Entertainment released the album on April 8, 2016.

== Critical reception ==
Professional ratings
Review scores
Source	Rating
CCM Magazine	4.5/5 stars
The Christian Manifesto	5/5 stars
New Release Today	4/5 stars

Andy Argyrakis, awarding the album four and a half stars at CCM Magazine, writes, "The Gray Havens continue crafting engaging folk/pop compositions with contemplative lyrics, while making noticeable strides creatively and personally." Giving the album four stars from New Release Today, Mary Nikkel states, "Ghost of a King is folk pop at its best, providing just enough musical accessibility to draw in a broad spectrum of listeners and lyrical depth that keeps us digging. This album cements The Gray Havens' status as one of the most promising indie darling acts of 2016." Christopher Smith, reviewing the album at Jesus Freak Hideout, describes, "Where Fire & Stone was only more rewarding with more listens, Ghost of a King leaves a stronger initial impression but doesn't quite have the 'masterpiece' quality of Fire & Stone. But even landing just shy of that album is a tremendous accomplishment." Rating the album five stars for The Christian Manifesto, writes, "This is just a perfect album." Michael Weaver, indicating in a review by Jesus Freak Hideout, says, "The Radfords have certainly proven that they know what they are doing and always leave you wanting just a little more."

== Track listing ==
ing
No.	Title	Length
1.	"Ghost in the Valley"	1:18
2.	"Shadows of the Dawn"	3:59
3.	"Ghost of a King"	4:42
4.	"Band of Gold"	3:32
5.	"Take This Slowly"	5:02
6.	"Diamonds and Gold"	3:24
7.	"This My Soul"	3:58
8.	"A Living Hope"	2:18
9.	"At Last, the King"	4:08
10.	"Go"	5:28
Total length:		37:42
