= Fire and Stone (album) =

Studio album by The Gray Havens
- Released: January 6, 2015
- Recorded: Sputnik Sound, Nashville, Tennessee
- Genres: Contemporary Christian music; contemporary worship music; Christian rock; folk pop; folk rock
- Length: 41:17

The Gray Havens chronology
Fire and Stone (2015)	Ghost of a King (2016)

Fire and Stone is the first studio album by The Gray Havens. They released the album on January 6, 2015.

== Critical reception ==
Professional ratings
Review scores
Source	Rating
CCM Magazine	4/5 stars
Christian Review Magazine	4.5/5 stars
Cross Rhythms	9/10 squares
Indie Vision Music	4/5 stars
The Phantom Tollbooth	3/5
Worship Leader	5/5 stars

Awarding the album four stars for CCM Magazine, Andy Argyrakis states, "this full-length debut is an enthralling and enlightening start to what's sure to be a fruitful career." Matthew Cordle, rating the album a nine out of ten at Cross Rhythms, writes, "In summary, original songwriting, expert musicianship and great production." Giving the album five stars from Worship Leader, Andrea Hunter describes, "The music of The Gray Havens delights and stirs reflection and celebration." Bert Saraco, indicating in a three out of five review by The Phantom Tollbooth, says, "Fine music, excellent production, unique arrangements, and interesting lyrics make Fire and Stone a project that stands out from the pack of usual suspects in the Christian charts."

Rating the album four stars from Indie Vision Music, Josh Hamm writes, "The Gray Havens have more than proven their mettle with Fire and Stone...Fire and Stone is a testament to the lasting impact of music laced with joy." Leah St. John, awarding the album four and a half stars for Christian Review Magazine, states, "Fire And Stone is a lovely album to listen to." Reviewing the album at Jesus Freak Hideout, Michael Weaver describes, "The Gray Havens' Fire and Stone is an excellent find...It offers fantastic (and immensely more difficult than some may realize) instrumentation, great lyrics that are original, thought-provoking, and fun, excellent production, and just an overall wonderful feel."

== Track listing ==
Fire and Stone
No.	Title	Length
1.	"Inheritance"	4:12
2.	"Songs in the Night"	3:55
3.	"The Stone"	4:51
4.	"Sirens"	4:05
5.	"Jack and Jill, Pt. 2"	5:00
6.	"Music, They Call Me"	4:42
7.	"Stole My Fame (To: Grace)"	2:45
8.	"Under the Mountain"	3:21
9.	"If the Walls Move"	4:02
10.	"Far Kingdom"	4:24
Total length:		41:17
