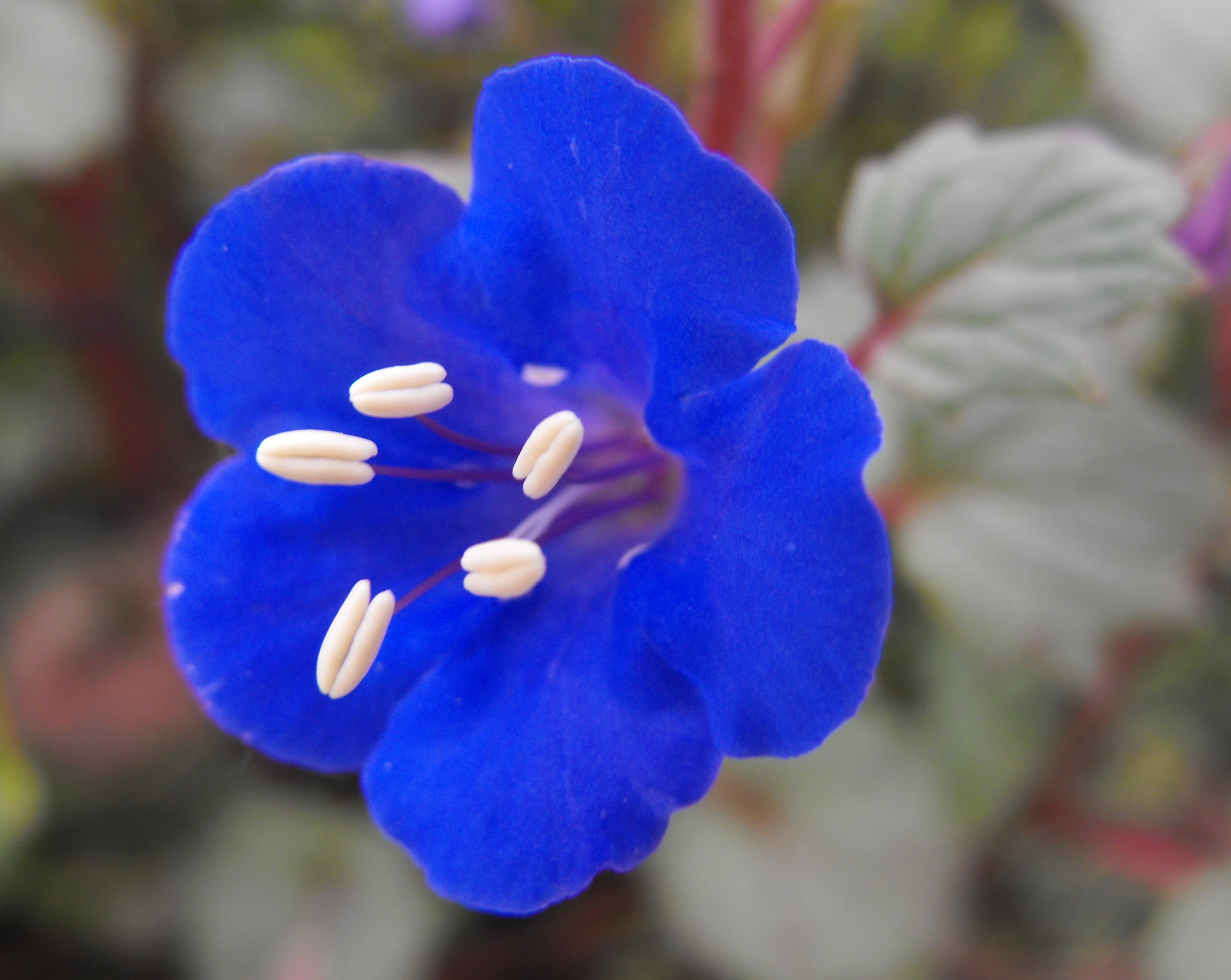

Conservation status
- Vulnerable (NatureServe)

Scientific classification
- Kingdom: Plantae
- Clade: Tracheophytes
- Clade: Angiosperms
- Clade: Eudicots
- Clade: Asterids
- Order: Boraginales
- Family: Hydrophyllaceae
- Genus: Phacelia
- Species: P. campanularia

Binomial name
- Phacelia campanularia A.Gray

Varieties
- P. c. var. campanularia; P. c. var. vasiformis (G.W.Gillett) Walden & R.Patt.

Synonyms
- Phacelia minor var. campanularia (A.Gray) Jeps.

= Phacelia campanularia =

Species of plant

Phacelia campanularia is a species of flowering plant in the family Hydrophyllaceae, known by the common names desertbells, desert bluebells, California-bluebell, desert scorpionweed, and desert Canterbury bells. Its true native range is within the borders of California, in the Mojave and Sonoran Deserts, but it is commonly cultivated as an ornamental plant and it can be found growing elsewhere as an introduced species.

== Description ==
This annual herb has an erect stem reaching 0.7 metres (2.3 ft) in maximum height. It is covered in glandular hairs. The leaf blades are somewhat rounded with toothed edges. The inflorescence is a loose cyme of flowers. The flower has a bright blue corolla up to 4 centimeters long which can be bell-shaped, funnel-shaped, or round and flattened. It can have white spots in the throat. The protruding stamens and style can be 4.5 centimeters long. The fruit is a capsule up to 1.5 centimeters long. It grows in dry, sandy places below 4,000 feet (1,200 m).

== Taxonomy ==
Two infraspecies are usually recognized, called subspecies or varieties.

- Phacelia campanularia var. campanularia – limited to the Sonoran Desert
- Phacelia campanularia var. vasiformis – more common, with a wider range, and sometimes with larger flowers

They can intergrade in some areas.

== Chemistry ==
The anthocyanin pigment phacelianin was isolated from the flowers of this species and is involved in the formation of their blue color. It is also responsible for the blue of the flowers of Evolvulus pilosus.

The juice, sap, or hairs may cause irritation or a skin rash and should be washed from skin as soon as possible.

== Gallery ==
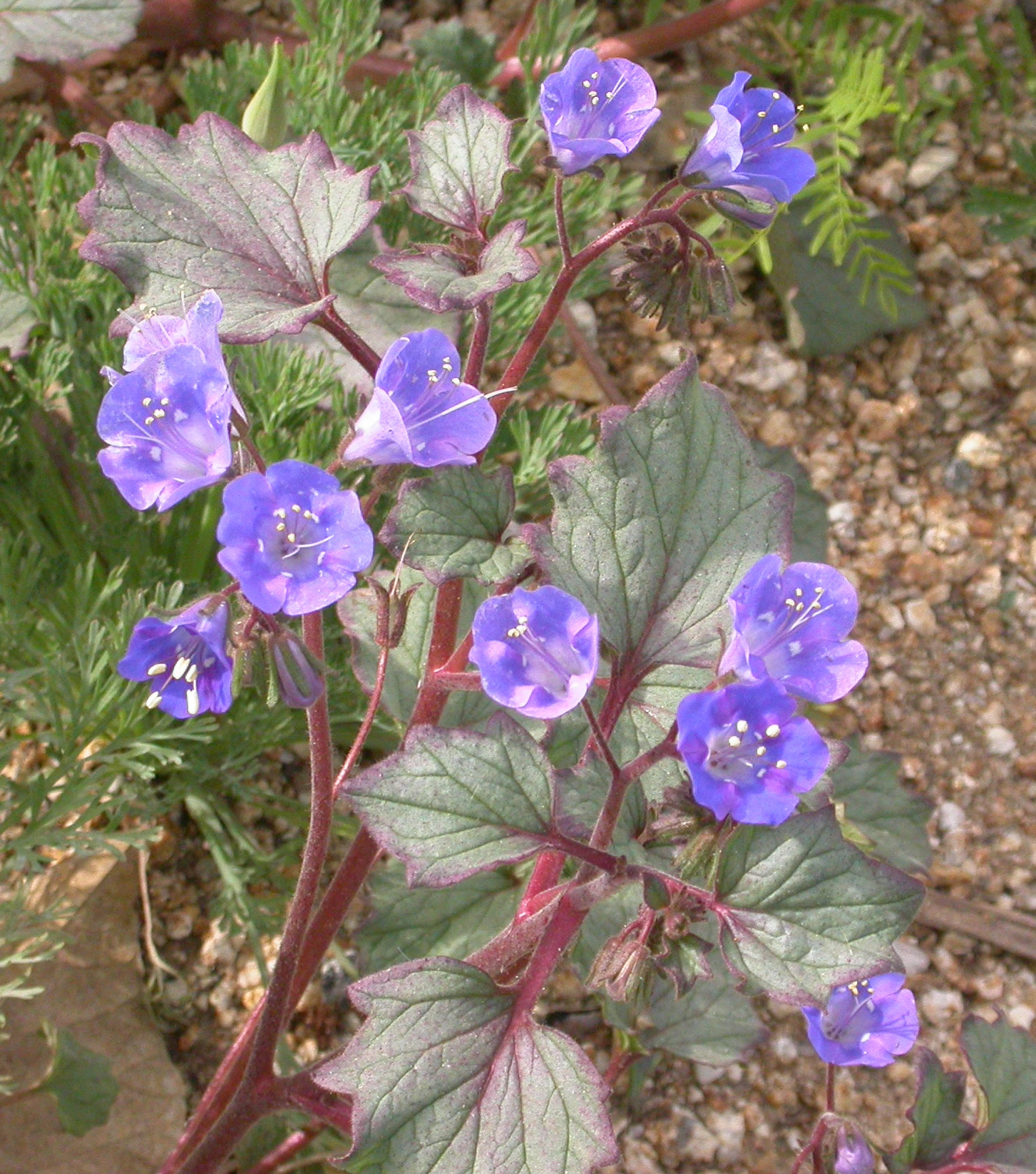
Form

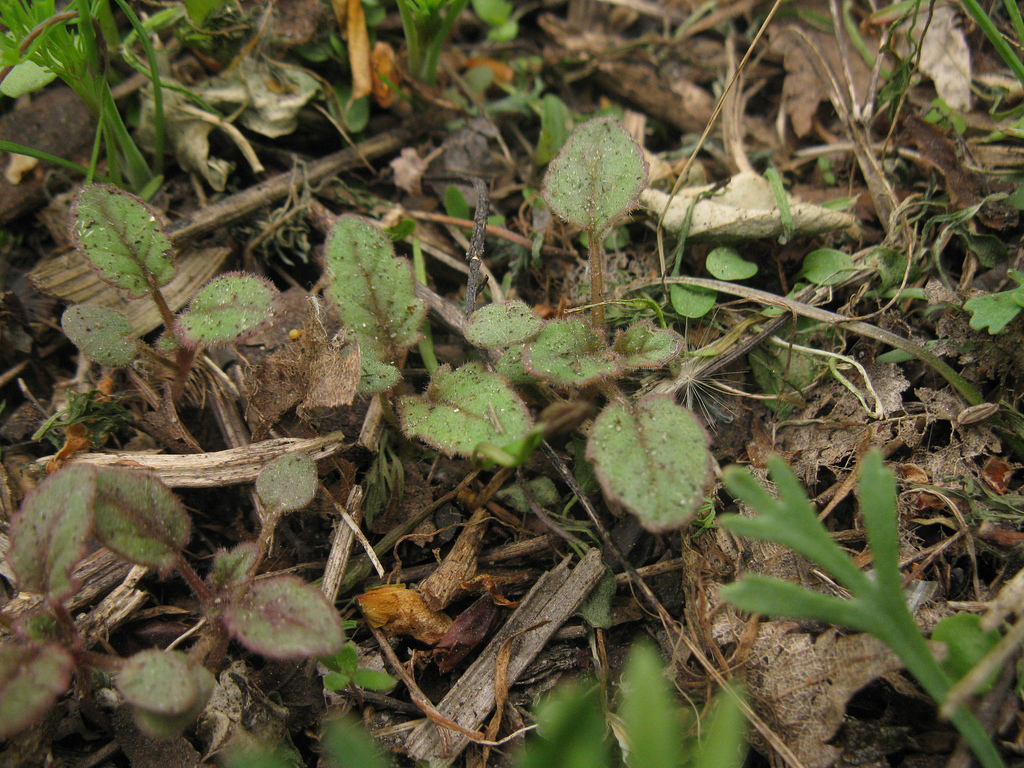
Seedlings

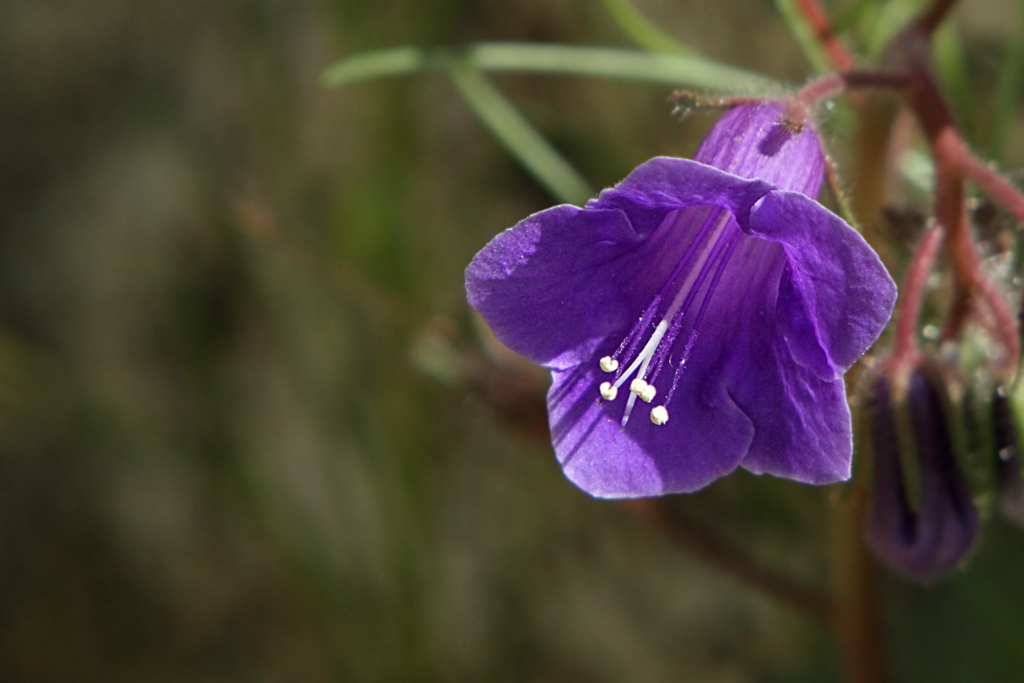
Flower

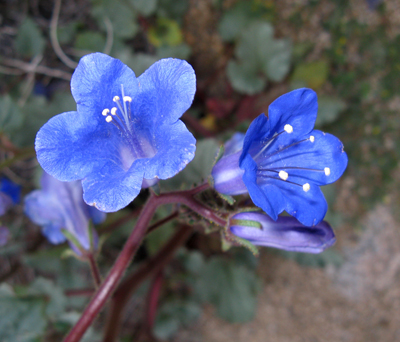
ssp. vasiformis
