= The Gray Havens =

American Christian folk pop duo

- Origin: Crystal Lake, Illinois
- Genres: Contemporary Christian music; contemporary worship music; Christian rock; country folk; folk rock; Christian country music
- Years active: 2012–present
- Label: Artist Garden
- Members: David Radford; Licia Radford
- Website: thegrayhavensmusic.com

The Gray Havens are an American Christian folk pop husband and wife duo, David and Licia Radford, from Crystal Lake, Illinois. They started their music recording careers in 2012. Their first release, an extended play, Where Eyes Don't Go, was released by Zodlounge Music, in 2013. Their first full album, Fire and Stone, was released in 2015 with funds raised on Kickstarter

== Background ==
The duo are a husband and wife group, who married on August 25, 2012. They met while on a mission trip to British Columbia. David and Licia Radford (née, Keyes) are from Crystal Lake, Illinois, David is a former American Idol contestant, vocalist, guitarist, and pianist, and, Licia is a vocalist, mandolinist, and an ukulelist. They are members of the Evangelical Free Church of Crystal Lake. They moved to Nashville, Tennessee in 2014.

== Music history ==
The husband and wife duo commenced their recording careers in 2012, with the extended play, Where Eyes Don't Go, and it was released on January 25, 2013 by Zodlounge Music. Their first studio album, Fire and Stone, was released on January 6, 2015, independently. It was ranked in the Top 10 Albums of 2015 on Jesusfreakhideout.com. Their second studio album, Ghost of a King, was released on April 8, 2016, by Artist Garden Entertainment.

== Members ==
- Dave Radford (born March 22, 1988) – vocals, guitar, piano
- Licia Radford (née, Keyes) (born September 21, 1990) – vocals, percussion, mandolin, ukulele

== Discography ==
Studio albums

- Fire and Stone (January 6, 2015)
- Ghost of a King (April 8, 2016, Artist Garden)
- Ghost of a King (Live) (October 6, 2017, Artist Garden)
- She Waits (October 5, 2018, Artist Garden)
- Instrumentals, Volume 1 (February 28, 2020, Blue Flower Records)
- Blue Flower (Instrumentals) (October 1, 2021, Blue Flower)
- Blue Flower (October 8, 2021, Blue Flower)
- Come Behold the Wondrous Mystery (November 10, 2023, Blue Flower)
- This is Not the End (September 5, 2025, Blue Flower Records)

EPs

- Where Eyes Don't Go (January 25, 2013)
- Take This Slowly // Autumn Sessions (January 1, 2018)
- Rest (September 25, 2020)
- Far Kingdom // Summer Sessions (September 16, 2022)
- Where the Living is Deep (January 17, 2025)
