= Flavonoid 3',5'-hydroxylase =

Identifiers
- EC no.: 1.14.14.81
- CAS no.: 94047-23-1

Databases
- IntEnz: IntEnz view
- BRENDA: BRENDA entry
- ExPASy: NiceZyme view
- KEGG: KEGG entry
- MetaCyc: metabolic pathway
- PRIAM: profile
- PDB structures: RCSB PDB PDBe PDBsum
Search
- PMC: articles
- PubMed: articles
- NCBI: proteins

Flavonoid 3',5'-hydroxylase (EC 1.14.14.81 was wrongly classified as EC 1.14.13.88 in the past) is an enzyme with systematic name flavanone,NADPH:oxygen oxidoreductase. This enzyme catalyses the following chemical reaction

flavanone + 2 NADPH + 2 H^{+} + 2 O_{2} $\rightleftharpoons$ 3',5'-dihydroxyflavanone + 2 NADP^{+} + 2 H_{2}O (overall reaction)
(1a) flavanone + NADPH + H^{+} + O_{2} $\rightleftharpoons$ 3'-hydroxyflavanone + NADP^{+} + H_{2}O
(1b) 3'-hydroxyflavanone + NADPH + H^{+} + O_{2} $\rightleftharpoons$ 3',5'-dihydroxyflavanone + NADP^{+} + H_{2}O

Flavonoid 3',5'-hydroxylase is a heme-thiolate protein (P-450).
