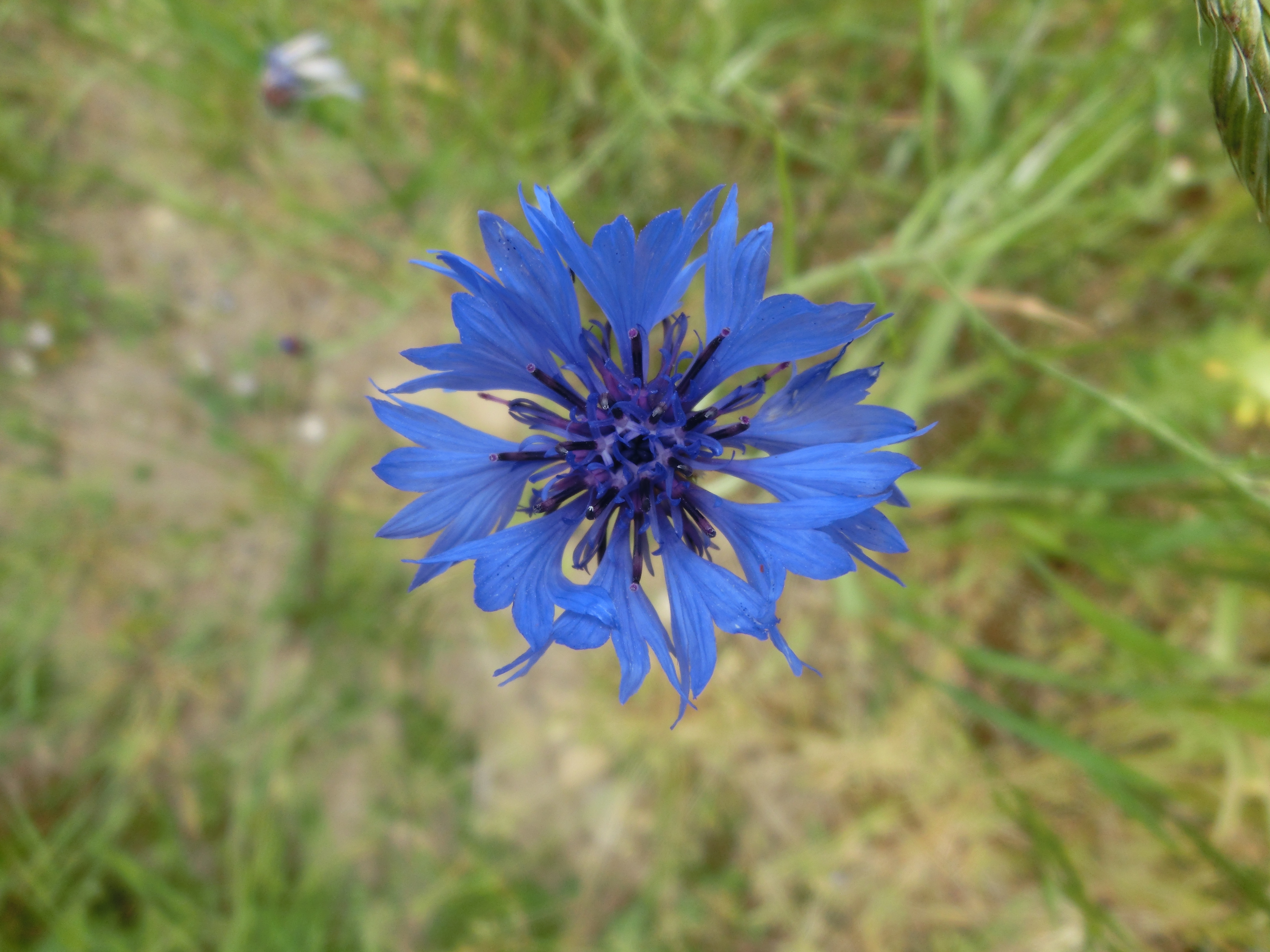
- Flower
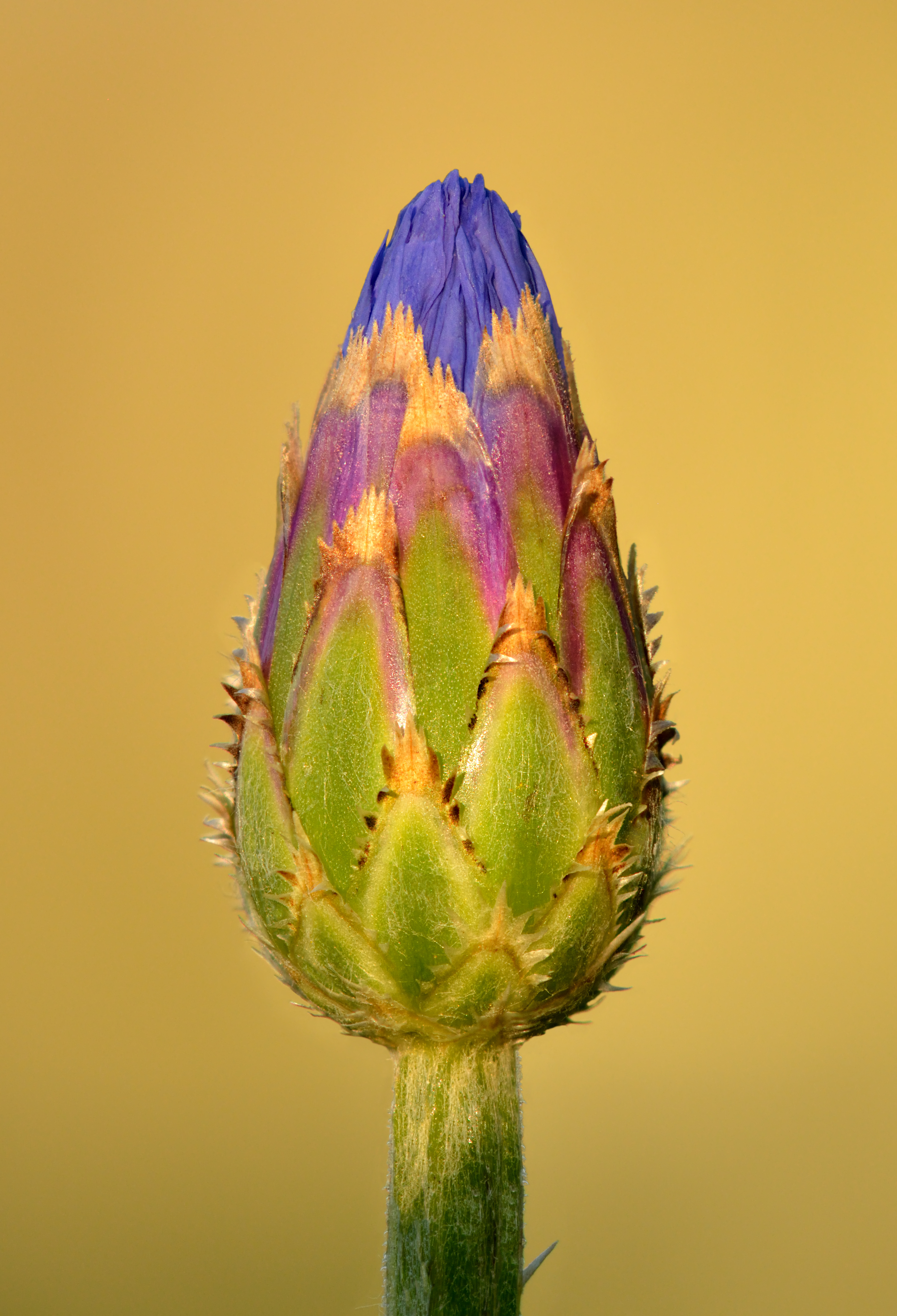
- Bud

Scientific classification
- Kingdom: Plantae
- Clade: Tracheophytes
- Clade: Angiosperms
- Clade: Eudicots
- Clade: Asterids
- Order: Asterales
- Family: Asteraceae
- Genus: Centaurea
- Species: C. cyanus

Binomial name
- Centaurea cyanus L.

= Centaurea cyanus =

Species of flowering plant

Centaurea cyanus, commonly known as cornflower or bachelor's button (among other names), is an annual flowering plant in the family Asteraceae native to Europe. In the past, it often grew as a weed in cornfields (in the broad sense of "corn", referring to grains, such as wheat, barley, rye, or oats), hence its name.

C. cyanus is now endangered in its native habitat by agricultural intensification, particularly by over-use of herbicides. However, it is now also naturalized in many other parts of the world, including North America and parts of Australia.

== Description ==
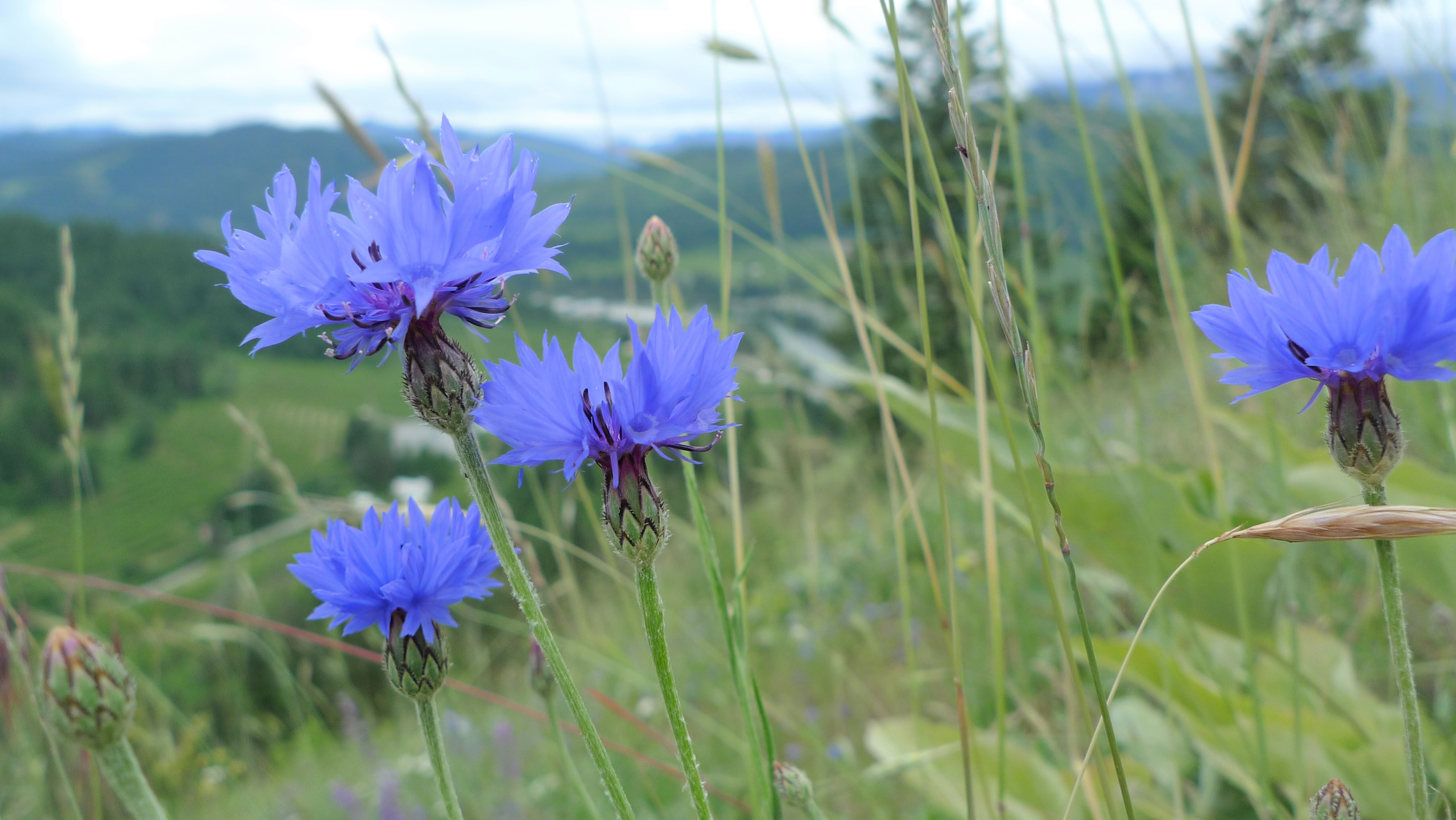
Introduced specimen near Peshastin, Chelan County, Washington

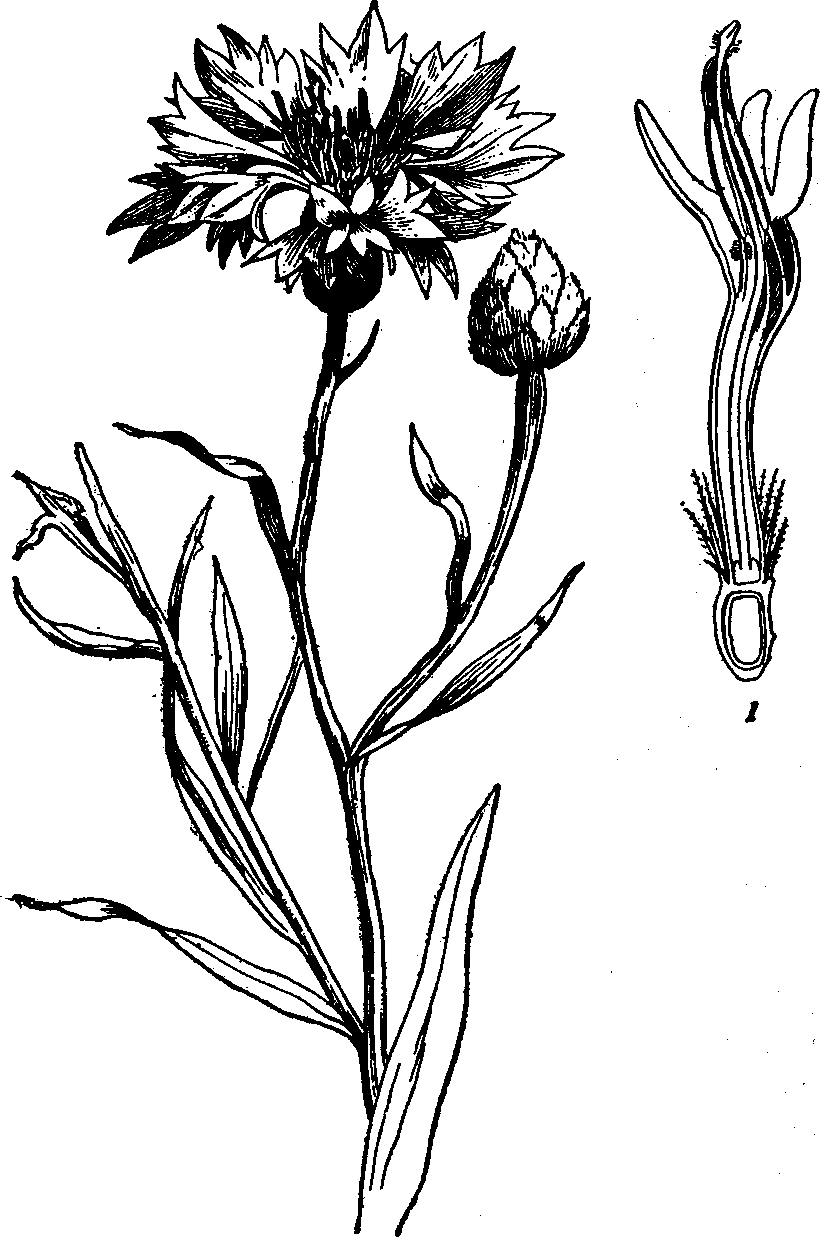
Flowering shoot; I. Disk-floret in vertical section

Centaurea cyanus is an annual plant growing to 20–100 centimetres (8–39 in) tall, with grey-green branched stems. The leaves are lanceolate and 3–10 cm (1–4 in) long. The flowers are most commonly an intense blue colour and arranged in flowerheads (capitula) of 1.5–3 cm diameter, with a ring of a few large, spreading ray florets surrounding a central cluster of disc florets. The blue pigment is protocyanin, which in roses is red. Fruits are approx. 3.5 mm long with 2–3 mm-long pappus bristles. It flowers all summer.

== Taxonomy ==
Centaurea cyanus was given its scientific name in 1753 by Carl Linnaeus. It is classified in the genus Centaurea as part of the Asteraceae family. The species has no accepted subspecies, but has one among its 21 synonyms.

Table of Synonyms
Name	Year	Rank	Notes
Centaurea cyaneum St.-Lag.	1880	species	= het., not validly publ.
Centaurea cyanocephala Velen.	1886	species	= het.
Centaurea cyanus subsp. coa Rech.f.	1949	subspecies	= het.
Centaurea cyanus var. denudata Suksd.	1927	variety	= het.
Centaurea hoffmanniana Asch.	1899	species	= het.
Centaurea hortorum Pau	1887	species	= het.
Centaurea lanata Roxb.	1832	species	= het.
Centaurea pulcherrima Wight ex DC.	1838	species	= het., not validly publ.
Centaurea pulchra DC.	1834	species	= het.
Centaurea rhizocephala Trautv.	1873	species	= het.
Centaurea segetalis Salisb.	1796	species	≡ hom., nom. illeg., superfl.
Centaurea umbrosa A.Huet ex Reut.	1856	species	= het.
Cyanus arvensis Moench	1794	species	= het.
Cyanus cyanus Hill	1768	species	= het.
Cyanus dentato-folius Gilib.	1782	species	= het., opus utique oppr.
Cyanus segetum Hill	1769	species	≡ hom.
Cyanus vulgaris Delarbre	1800	species	= het.
Jacea segetalis Lam. ex Steud.	1840	species	= het.
Jacea segetum Lam.	1779	species	= het.
Leucacantha cyanus Nieuwl. & Lunell	1917	species	= het.
Setachna cyanus Dulac	1867	species	= het.
Notes: ≡ homotypic synonym ; = heterotypic synonym

=== Genetics ===
Centaurea cyanus is a diploid flower (2n = 24). The genetic diversity within populations is high, although there could be a future decline in diversity due to population fragmentation and intensive agriculture. In general, Centaurea cyanus is a self-incompatible species. However, selfing still occurs occasionally, but results in inbreeding depression.

=== Names ===
The genus name, Centaurea, is derived from the Greek κένταυρος (kéntaura) meaning "centaur". The species name, cyanus, is Botanical Latin also taken from the Ancient Greek κύανος (kúanos) meaning "dark blue" as a reference to the color of the flowers.

The common name bachelor's button is an allusion to the shape of the flowers. Originally the bachelor's buttons was applied to the double form of the common buttercup (Ranunculus acris), but it has been applied to various round flowers. The name cornflower is often used for this species in particular, but is also used for other weedy species that grow among corn in the sense of any grain crop such as the common corncockle. The name bluebottle continues in common use, having been coined in the form blewbothel around 1450.

Other names include blue cap, a rare English regional name, blue blobs, blue bonnet, bluet, cornbottle, boutonierre flower, ragged robin, and gogglebuster. Though the name ragged sailor is applied to the species, it is also sometimes used for chicory (Cichorium intybus). The name hurtsickle or hurt-sickle, dates to the late 1500s. This name came from farmers believing that it would blunt their sickles when cutting fields.

== Distribution and habitat ==
Centaurea cyanus is native to temperate Europe, but is widely naturalized in many other parts of the world, including North America and parts of Australia through introduction as an ornamental plant in gardens and as a seed contaminant in crop seeds.

It has been present in Britain and Ireland as an archaeophyte (ancient introduction) since the Iron Age. In the United Kingdom, it has declined from 264 sites to just 3 sites in the last 50 years.

In reaction to this, the conservation charity Plantlife named it as one of 101 species it would actively work to bring 'back from the brink'.

In County Clare (VC H9), Ireland, C. cyanus is recorded in arable fields as very rare and almost extinct, while in northeast Ireland, it was abundant before the 1930s.

== Ecology ==
=== Weed in arable crops ===
Centaurea cyanus is considered a noxious weed in arable crops, especially cereals and rapeseed. In winter wheat, one plant per m^{2} can cause a yield loss of up to 30 kg / ha. Centaurea cyanus produces around 800 seed per plant, which are either shed shortly before the harvest of cereals, or they are threshed together with the cereal grains, contributing to the further spread of the species by the harvesting machinery and contaminated seed. The occurrence of Centaurea cyanus strongly decreased during the last decades due to improved seed cleaning, more intensive nitrogen fertilization and herbicide use. However, Centaurea cyanus has become more common in cropland due to an increase in crop rotations dominated by winter cereals and rapeseed and the use of more selective herbicides with a low effectiveness against Centaurea cyanus. In addition, the emergence of resistance against the herbicide class of sulfonylureas has been reported recently. Due to its strong roots, Centaurea cyanus is difficult to control mechanically in spring.

=== Fodder for insects and birds ===
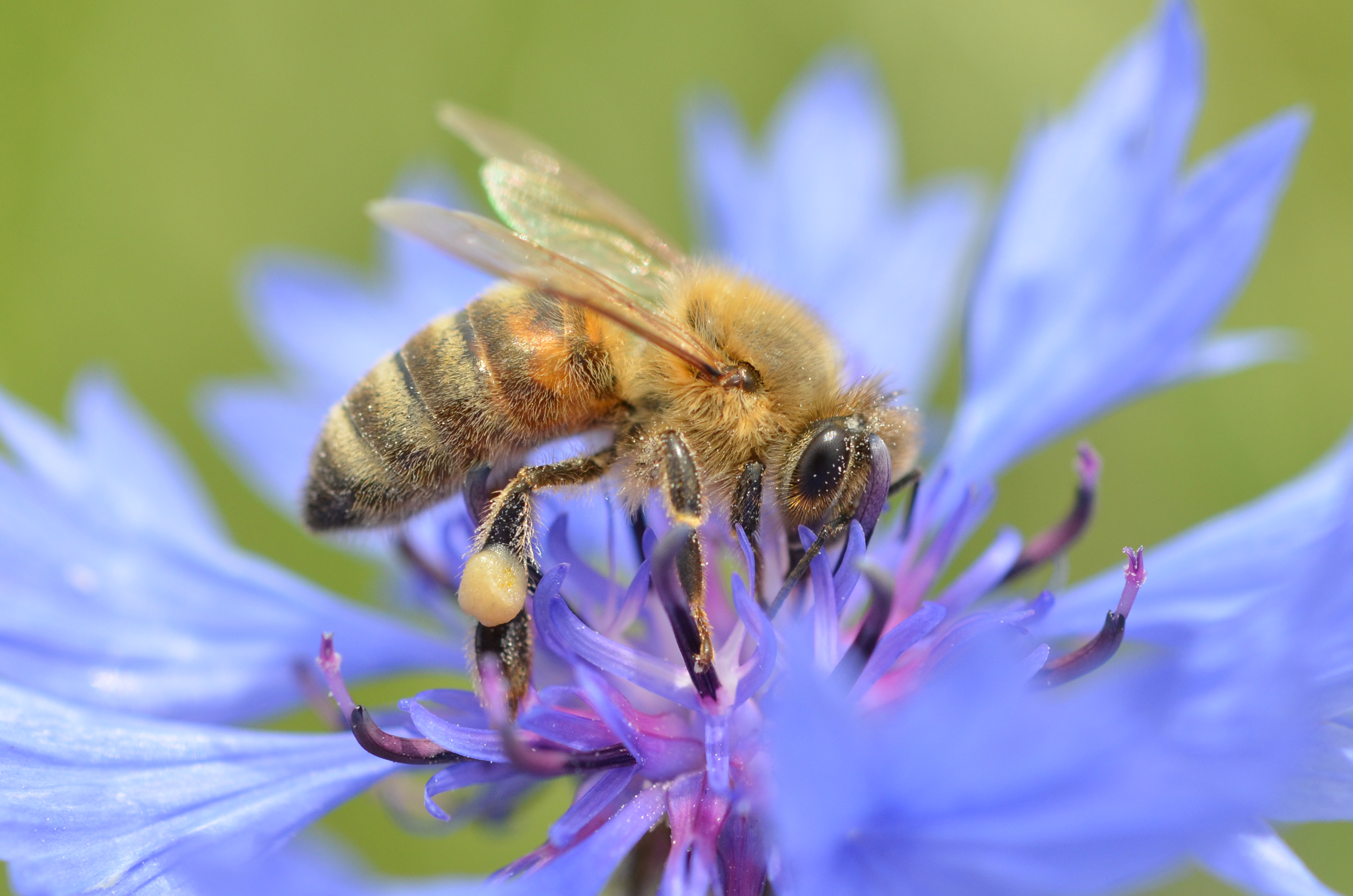
A honey bee on a cornflower

The pollen of Centaurea cyanus is used by several different insect species. Insects of the orders Hymenoptera and Diptera are particularly attracted by the flower. As Centaurea cyanus is a self-incompatible species, it needs external pollination. The nectar of Centaurea cyanus is very sweet with a sugar content of 34%. Due to its high sugar production of up to 0.2 mg sugar per day and flower, the species is highly appreciated by beekeepers.

The seeds of Centaurea cyanus are one of the favourite foods of the European goldfinch.

=== Control of insect pests ===
Centaurea cyanus was found to produce volatiles attracting Microplitis mediator, which is a major parasitoid of the cabbage moth (Mamestra brassicae), which is the most important pest of cabbage (Brassica oleracea) in central Europe. Planting Centaurea cyanus in cabbage fields as a companion plant was thus suggested as an alternative to the widespread use of insecticides to control Mamestra brassicae. Field experiments showed that planting Centaurea cyanus in cabbage fields at a density of 1 plant / m^{2} can result in a significant increase in parasitation of Mamestra brassicae larvae, predation of Mamestra brassicae eggs (e.g. by carabid beetles or spiders) and ultimately cabbage yield.

== Cultivation ==
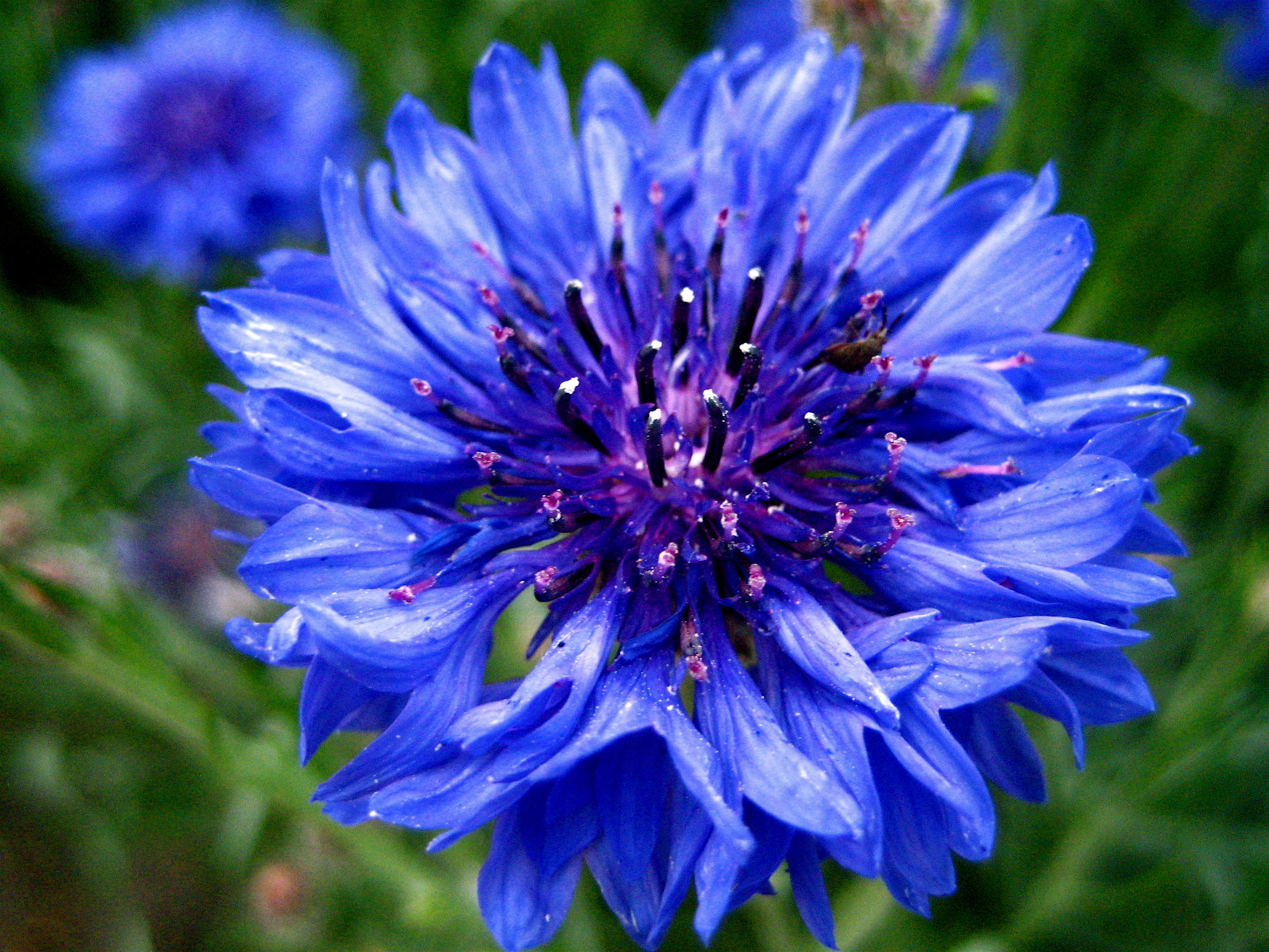
Flower

Several cultivars of Centaurea cyanus with varying pastel colours, including pink and purple, have been selected for ornamental purposes. The species is also grown for the cut flower industry in Canada for use by florists. Doubled blue cultivars (such as 'Blue Boy' or 'Blue Diadem') are most commonly used for this purpose, but white, pink, lavender and black (actually a very dark maroon) cultivars are also used, albeit to a lesser extent.

=== Breeding goals ===
As for all ornamental plants, important goals of Centaurea cyanus breeding include the induction of phenotypic variation (e.g. in flower coloration, size and shape, foliage characteristics or plant height), higher flower yield, resistance to pests and diseases as well as tolerance to abiotic stress (e.g., extreme temperatures, drought or salinity).

=== Soil and climate requirements ===
Centaurea cyanus requires full sun and neutral (pH 6.6–7.5) to mildly alkaline (pH 7.6–7.8), moist and well-drained soil. However, Centaurea cyanus is quite tolerant to drought once established.

=== Sowing ===
For summer-blooming plants, sowing should be executed in late spring. In moderate climates, however, it is also possible to sow Centaurea cyanus in early autumn. In this case, plants will already start to flower in the following spring. Recommended spacing between plants is approx. 20 to 30 cm. Centaurea cyanus can germinate from up to 10 cm depth, but the best result is obtained at 1 cm sowing depth. Germination occurs quickly after sowing.

=== Fertilization and cultural practices ===
High phosphorus fertilization in mid-summer will increase flower production. Mulching is recommended to prevent drying out of the soil and exposure of the root system to the sun.

=== Pests and diseases ===
In general, Centaurea cyanus is not very susceptible to pests and plant diseases. However, it may be affected by stem rot and stem rust if grown too tightly or by powdery mildew. Furthermore, aphids and leafhoppers can cause relevant damage to Centaurea cyanus.

=== Seed harvesting ===
Seeds are harvested either by hand or, in an agricultural setting, with a seed harvesting machine. On average there are 97,000 seeds in a pound of cornflower seeds.

Hand collecting can be time-consuming and yields are rather low.

A seed harvesting machine is more efficient than collecting the seeds by hand, but it is costly. The main principle of such a machine is that it brushes the ripe seeds off the plant and creates a cross flow fan action that generates sufficient air velocity to hold and gather the seeds into the seed bunker.

=== Pruning ===
Deadheading will encourage the plant to produce more blooms. Cornflowers are often used for ornamental purposes and by cutting them, up to their third leaves, they will produce more blooms and grow a bigger stem.

== Uses ==
=== Culinary ===
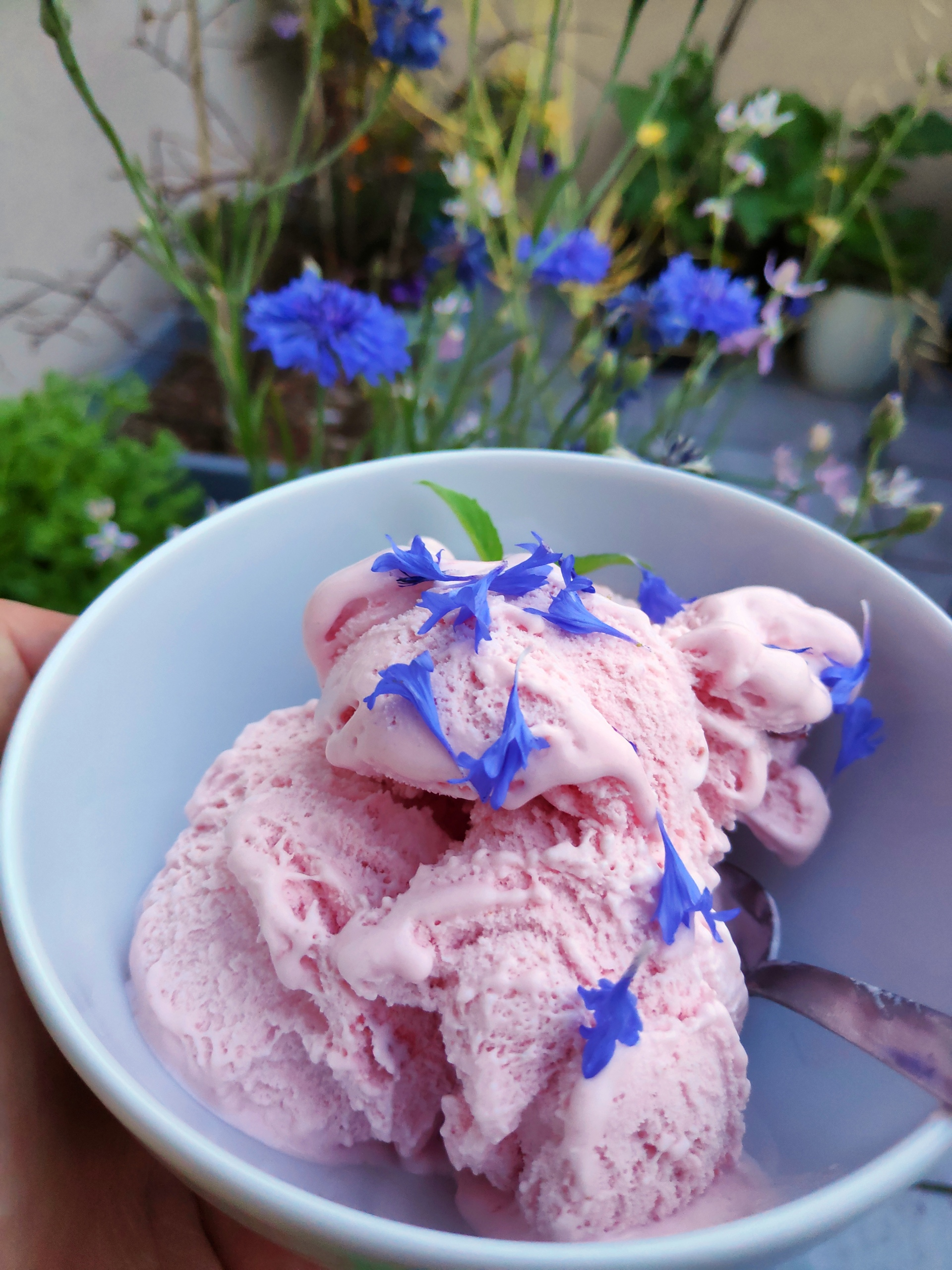
Raw cornflower petals used as a dessert decoration ingredient on strawberry ice cream

The flowers of Centaurea cyanus can be eaten raw, dried or cooked. Dried petals are used in foods, including in spices. Their main purpose is to add colour to food. There are cheeses or oils that contain raw petals. Petals can also be added to salads, drinks, and desserts for garnishing purposes in raw or dried form.

Dried petals are also used in teas and other beverages. Blue cornflower petals are sometimes one of the ingredients in Lady Grey tea.

=== Medicine ===
Centaurea cyanus contains a wide range of pharmacologically active compounds, such as flavonoids, anthocyanins and aromatic acids. Especially the flower head finds application in herbal medicine, but leaves and seeds are also used for pharmacological purposes, albeit to a lesser extent.

In particular, extracts from the flower heads have anti-inflammatory properties used in the treatment of minor ocular inflammations. Antioxidant properties are high due to ascorbic acid and phenolic compounds. Furthermore, extracts of the flower head and vegetative parts of the plant were shown to have gastroprotective effects due to their content of quercetin, apigenin and caffeic acid derivates.

=== Pigment ===
The blue color of Centaurea cyanus is due to protocyanin, an anthocyanin pigment that is also found in roses. Different anthocyanins derived from Centaurea cyanus are used as natural additives in food products, such as yoghurts.

=== Phytoremediation ===
Centaurea cyanus has been evaluated for phytoremediation of soils contaminated with lead. Inoculation of the contaminated soil with Glomus spp. (fungus) and Pseudomonas spp. (bacterium) would significantly enhance the biomass production and lead uptake of Centaurea cyanus.

== In culture ==
Cornflower pictured in the coat of arms of Keila

In folklore, cornflowers were worn by young men in love; if the flower faded too quickly, it was taken as a sign that the man's love was not returned.

The blue cornflower was one of the national symbols of Germany. This is partly due to the story that when Queen Louise of Prussia was fleeing Berlin and pursued by Napoleon's forces, she hid her children in a field of cornflowers and kept them quiet by weaving wreaths for them from the flowers. The flower thus became identified with Prussia, not least because it was the same color as the Prussian military uniform. After the unification of Germany in 1871, it went on to become a symbol of the country as a whole. For this reason, in Austria the blue cornflower is a political symbol for pan-German and rightist ideas. It was worn as a secret symbol identifying members of the then-illegal NSDAP in Austria in the 1930s. Members of the Freedom Party wore it at the openings of the Austrian parliament since 2006. After the 2017 general election, they replaced it with the edelweiss.

It was also the favourite flower of Louise's son Kaiser Wilhelm I. Because of its ties to royalty, authors such as Theodor Fontane have used it symbolically, often sarcastically, to comment on the social and political climate of the time.

The cornflower is also often seen as an inspiration for the German Romantic symbol of the Blue Flower.

Due to its traditional association with Germany, the cornflower has been made the official symbol of the annual German-American Steuben Parade.

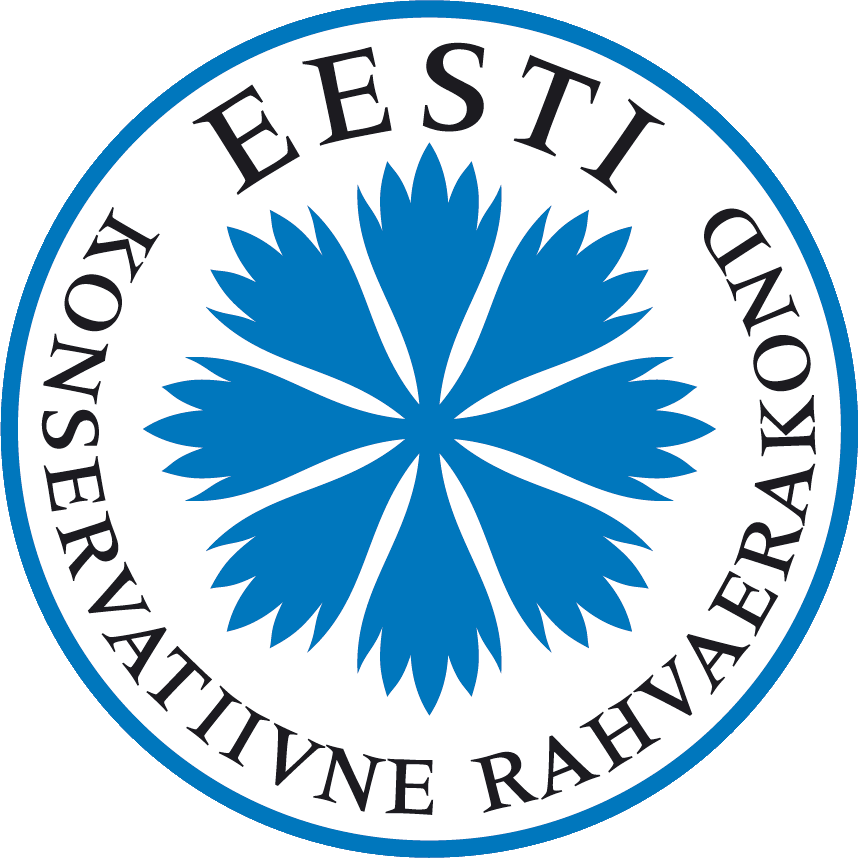
Logo of the Conservative People's Party of Estonia

The blue cornflower has been the national flower of Estonia since 1969 and symbolizes daily bread to Estonians. It is also the symbol of the Estonian Conservative People's Party.

Cornflower is one of the symbols of Belarus and the Belarusian nation. It reflects the openness and sincerity of Belarusians and their place on planet Earth.

It is also the symbol of the Finnish National Coalition Party, and the Liberal People's Party of Sweden, where it has since the dawn of the 20th century been a symbol for social liberalism.

It is the official flower of the Swedish province of Östergötland and the school flower of Winchester College and also of Dulwich College, where it is said to have been the favourite flower of the founder, Edward Alleyn.

In France the bleuet de France is the symbol of the 11 November 1918 armistice and, as such, a common symbol for veterans (especially the now defunct poilus of World War I), similar to the Remembrance poppies worn in the United Kingdom and in Canada.

The cornflower is also the symbol for motor neurone disease and amyotrophic lateral sclerosis.

Cornflowers are sometimes worn by Old Harrovians, former pupils of the British Harrow School.

A blue cornflower was used by Corning Glass Works for the initial release of Corning Ware Pyroceram cookware. Its popularity in the United States, Canada, United Kingdom and Australia was so high that it became the symbol of Corning Glass Works.

=== In paintings ===
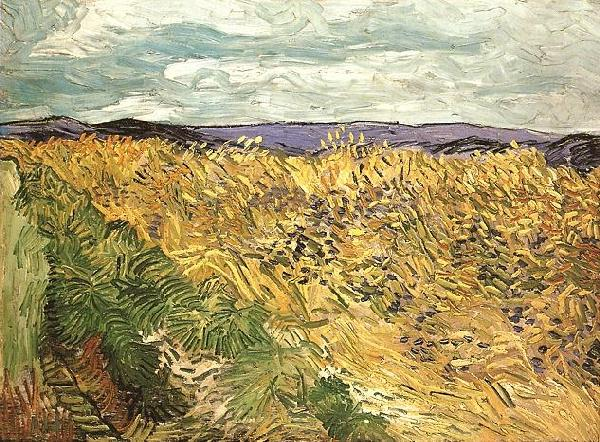
Vincent van Gogh, Wheat Field with Cornflowers, 1890

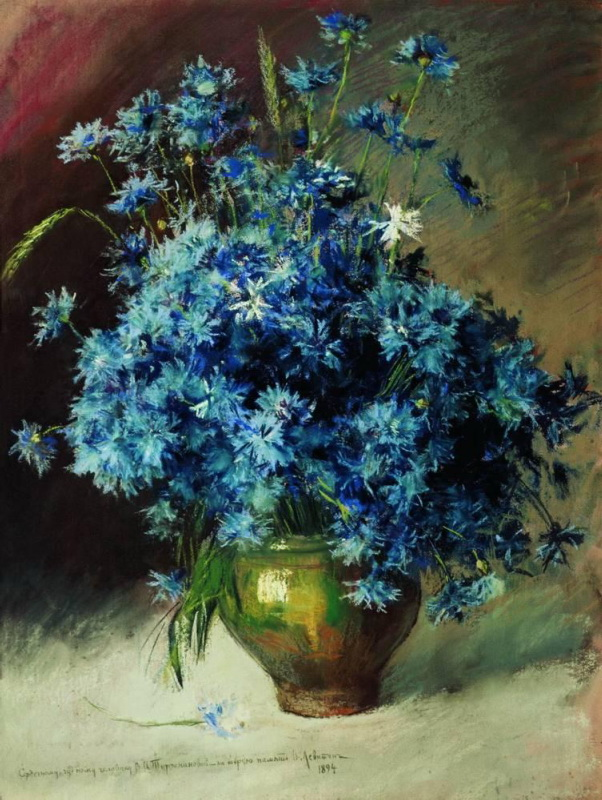
Isaac Levitan, Cornflowers, 1894

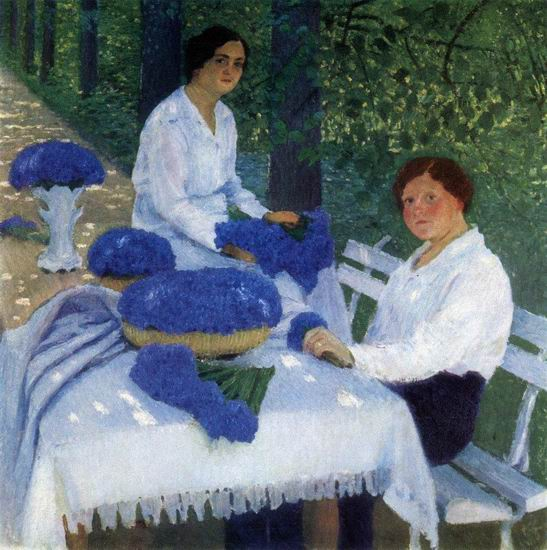
Igor Grabar, Group Portrait with Cornflowers, 1914

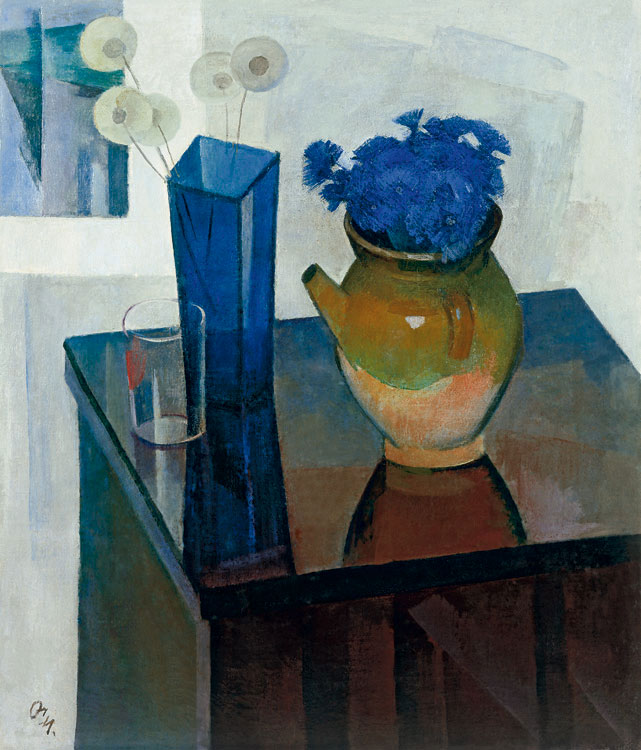
Sergei Osipov, Cornflowers, 1976

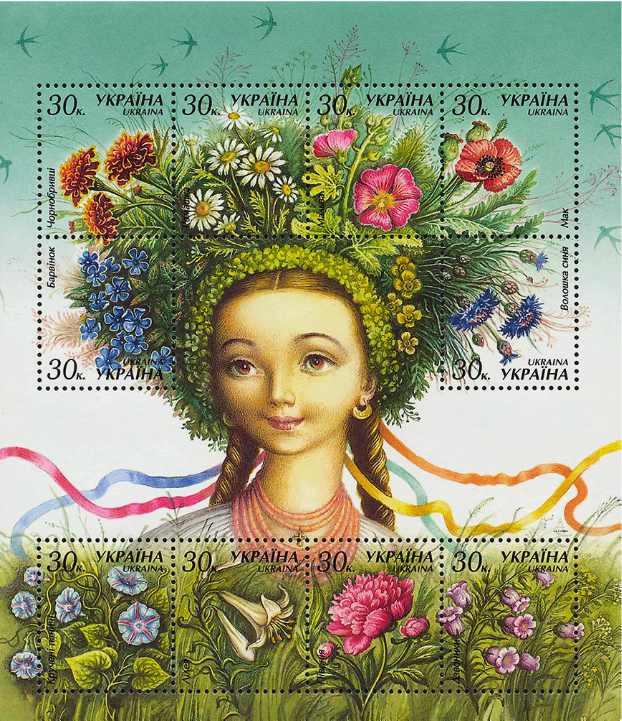
Ukrainian stamp set: "Ukrainian Flowers" (2000), with cornflowers on the right. Painting by Kateryna Shtanko.

== See also ==
- Cornflower blue
