= Escaped plant =

Plant that escapes cultivation

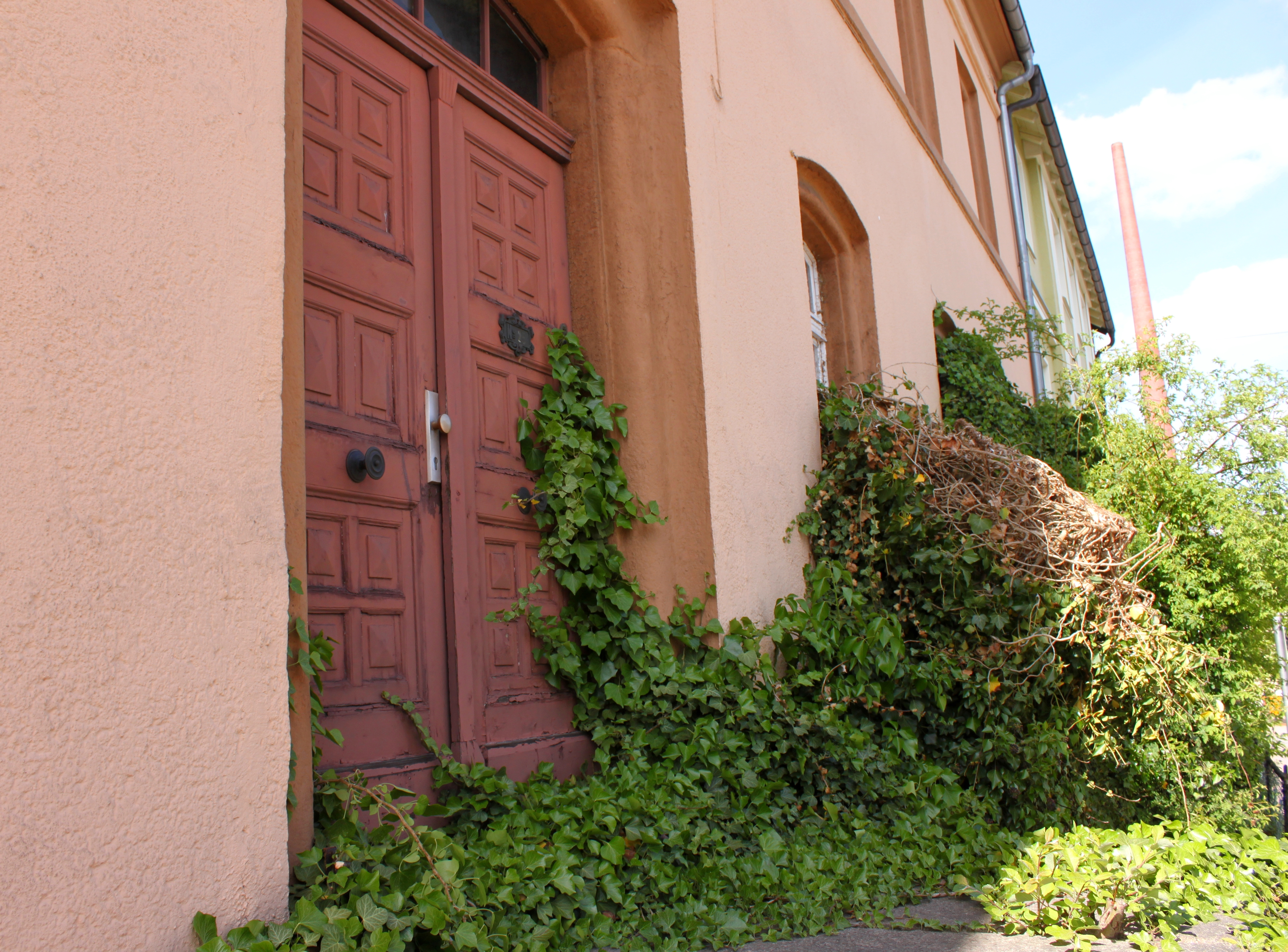
Untended, overgrown plants can escape by rooting elsewhere (English ivy)

An escaped plant is a cultivated plant that has escaped from horticulture, forestry, or garden cultivation and has become naturalized in the wild. Usually not native to an area, escaped plants may become invasive. Therefore, escaped plants are the subject of research in invasion biology.

All escaped plants belong to the so-called hemerochoric plants. This term is used across the board for plants that have been introduced directly or indirectly by humans. The term also includes the unintentionally introduced plants that were introduced through seed pollution (speirochoric) or through unintentional transport (agochoric).

Some ornamental plants have characteristics which allow them to escape cultivation and become weedy in alien ecosystems with far-reaching ecological and economic consequences. Escaped garden plants may be called garden escapes or escaped ornamentals. Sometimes, their origins can even be traced back to botanical gardens.

== Dispersal ==
Plants may escape from cultivation in various ways, including the dumping of green waste in bushland and road reserves and by birds or other animals eating the fruits or seeds and dispersing them. Others are accidental hitchhikers that escape on ships, vehicles, and equipment. Plants can also escape through sending stolons (runners), as stolons are capable of independent growth in other areas.

Garden escapees can be adventive, which means they can be established by human influence in a site outside their area of origin. Some plants, such as the opium poppy Papaver somniferum, escaped from cultivation so long ago that they are considered archaeophytes, and their original source may be obscure.

Occasionally, seed contamination also introduces new plants that could reproduce for a short period of time. The proportion of adventitious species in open ruderal corridors at such locations can exceed 30% of the flora of these locations. Further, ornamental alien plants can easily escape their confined areas (such as gardens and greenhouses) and naturalize if the climate outside changes to their benefit. In the US, there are over 5,000 escaped plants, many of which are escaped ornamentals.

== Ecological threats ==
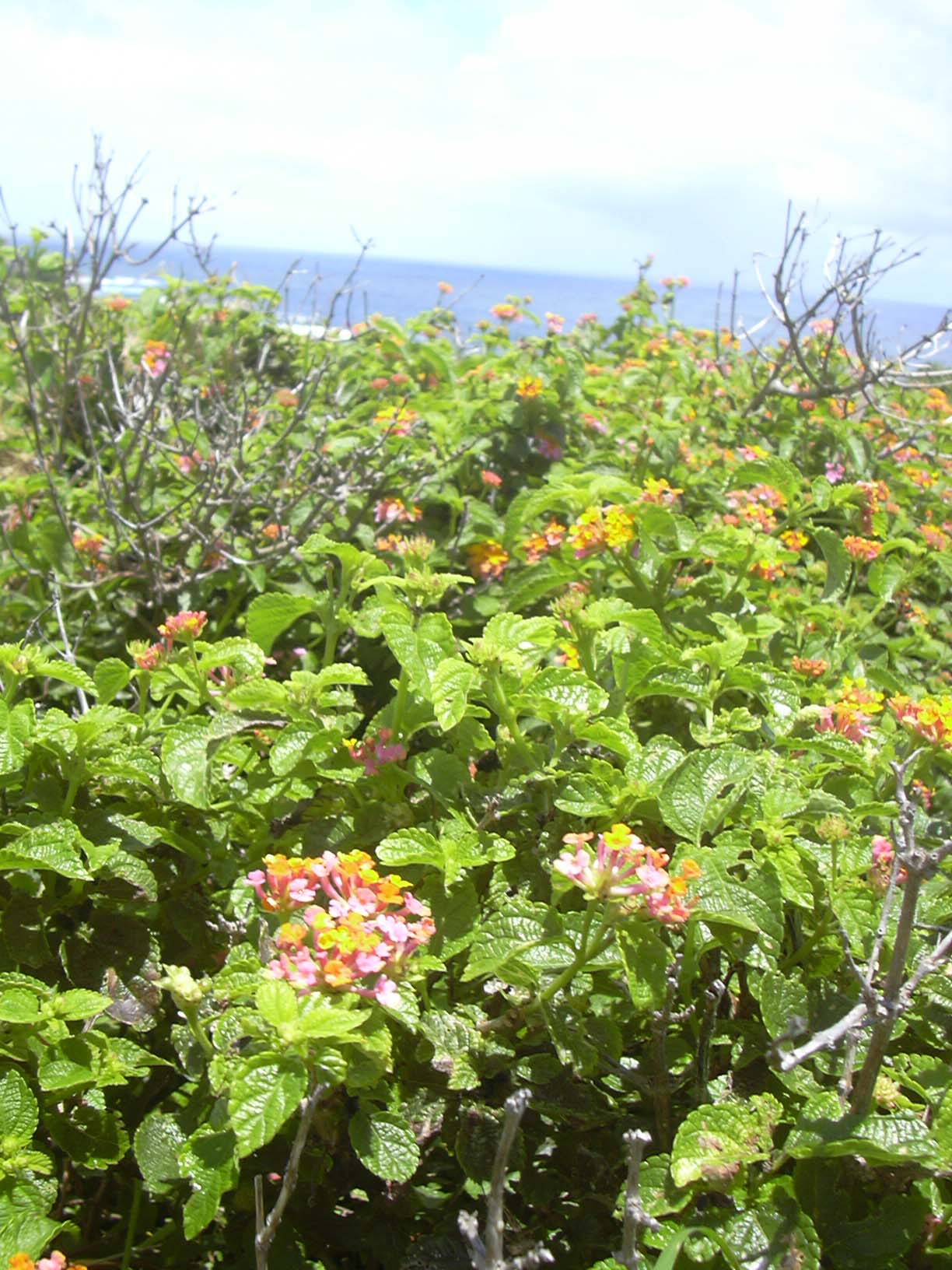
Lantana camara can escape from gardens into nearby wildlands.

Many invasive neophytes in Australia and New Zealand were originally garden escapees. The Jerusalem thorn forms impenetrable thorny thickets in the Northern Territory which can be several kilometers in length and width. Two other plants introduced as ornamental garden plants, Asparagus asparagoides and Chrysanthemoides monilifera, now dominate the herbaceous layer in many eucalyptus forests and supplant perennials, grasses, orchids, and lilies.

Neophytes that compete aggressively, and which displace and repel populations of native species, may permanently change the habitat for native species and can become an economic problem. For example, species of Opuntia (prickly pears) have been introduced from America to Australia, and have become wild, thus rendering territories unsuitable for breeding; the same goes for European gorse (Ulex europaeus) in New Zealand.

Rhododendron species introduced as ornamental garden plants in the British Isles crowd out island vegetation. The same can be seen in many acidic peatlands in the Atlantic and subatlantic climates. Robinia pseudoacacia was imported from America to Central Europe for its rapid growth, and it now threatens the scarce steppe and natural forest areas of the drylands. Examples in forests include Prunus serotina which was initially introduced to speed up the accumulation of humus.

In North America, Tamarisk trees, native to southern Europe and temperate parts of Asia, have proven to be problematic plants. In nutrient-poor heaths, but rich in grasses and bushes (fynbos) in the region Cape in South Africa, species of eucalyptus from Australia are growing strongly. As they are largely accustomed to poor soils, and in the Cape region they lack competitors for nutrients and parasites that could regulate their population, they are able to greatly modify the biotope. In Hawaii, the epiphytic fern Phlebodium aureum, native to the tropical Americas, has spread widely and is considered an invasive plant.

Particularly unstable ecosystems, already unbalanced by attacks or possessing certain characteristics, can be further damaged by escaped plants if the vegetation is already weakened. In the humid forests of Australia, escaped plants first colonize along roads and paths and then enter the interior of the regions they surround.

Thunbergia mysorensis, native to India, invaded the rainforests around the coastal city of Cairns in Queensland and even invades trees 40 m high. In Central Australia, the Eurasian species Tamarix aphylla grows along river banks, repelling native tree species, and wildlife that go together, lowers water levels and increases soil salinity. As in the United States, tamarisks have proven to be formidable bio-invaders. The fight against this species of trees, which has spread widely since, appears to be almost hopeless.

== Related terms ==
Escaped plants can fall within the definition of, and may have a relation to, these botanical terminologies below:

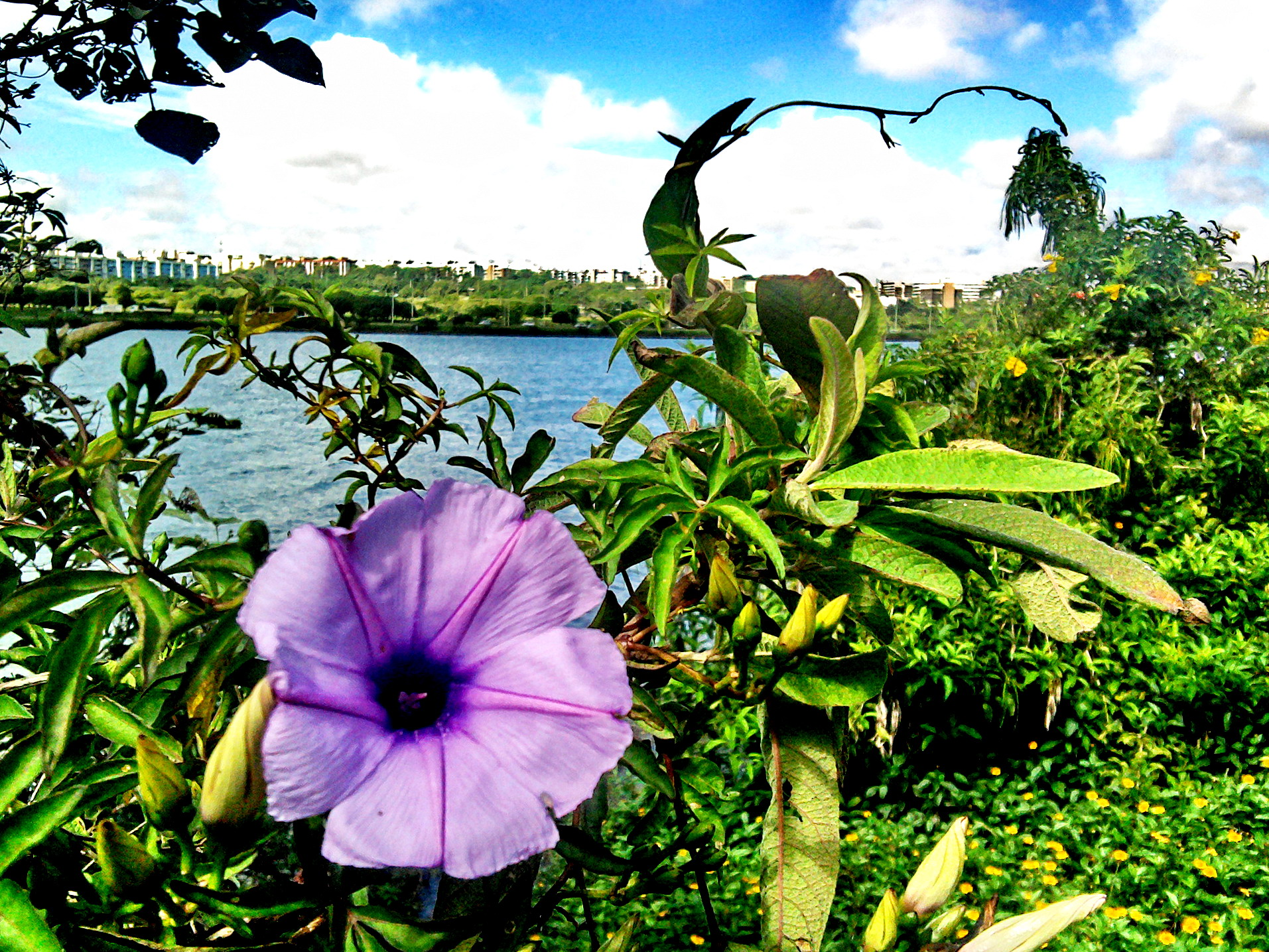
Cairo Morning Glory can easily escape gardens by seed, runners and stem fragments.

- Agriophyte: Refers to plant species that have invaded natural or near-natural vegetation and can survive there without human intervention. Established in their new natural habitats, they remain part of natural vegetation even after human influence has ceased, and are independent of humans in their continued existence. Examples in Central Europe are waterweed, Douglas fir and Japanese knotweed
- Alien: A non native species introduced by man.
- Archaeophyte: An alien species introduced by human activity long ago, such as the sweet chestnuts introduced by the Romans in Germany and now part of natural vegetation, and the opium and field poppies.
- Epecophyte: Species of recent appearance, usually numerous and constant in the country, but confined to artificial habitats, such as meadows and ruderal vegetation. They are dependent on humans for existence that their habitats require constant renewal.
- Ephemerophyte: Species that are only introduced inconsistently, that die briefly from culture or that would disappear again without constant replenishment of seeds. In other words, they can establish themselves temporarily, but they are not in a position to meet all the conditions relating to the territory. A cold winter, or an unusual drought, can lead to the death of these plants; most of the time, they are not able to fight against the local flora in extreme conditions.
- Hemerochory: Plants or their seeds may have been transported voluntarily (introduction) or involuntarily by humans in a territory which they could not have colonized by their own natural mechanisms of dissemination, or at least much more slowly. They are able to maintain themselves in this new vital space without voluntary help from man. Many Central European cultivated and ornamental plants are hemerochoric – insofar as they have escaped and subsist independently of cultivation. These are the forms of hemerochory:
  - Agochoric: Plants that are spread through accidental transport with, among other things, ships, trains, and cars. On land, agochoric plants used to be common in harbors, at train stations, or along railway lines. Australia, like New Zealand, has taken stringent measures to prevent the spread by seed or human transport. Agricultural implements imported into Australia must be thoroughly cleaned. Air travelers from other continents are forced to thoroughly clean the soles of their shoes.
  - Ethelochoric: Deliberate introduction by seedlings, seeds, or plants in a new habitat by humans. Many cultivated plants which currently play an important role in human nutrition have been deliberately disseminated by humans. Wheat, barley, lentil, broad bean and flax, for example.
  - Speirochoric: Unintentional introduction by seeds. As all seed samples also contain the seeds of the grasses of the field from which they were obtained, the trade-in seeds of useful plants has also allowed the spread of other species. Speirochoric plants are therefore sown on soil prepared by man and compete with useful plants. Wild chamomile, poppy, cornflower, corn buttercup are example of plants that were unintentionally scattered.
- Neophyte: An alien species introduced by man after 1500 AD.

== Example species ==
Examples of escaped plants and/or garden escapees include:

- Alchemilla mollis
- Allium schoenoprasum
- Allium ursinum
- Anredera cordifolia
- Aquilegia vulgaris
- Araujia sericifera
- Ardisia crenata
- Asclepias tuberosa
- Asparagus aethiopicus
- Baccharis halimifolia
- Bartlettina sordida
- Berberis thunbergii
- Borago officinalis
- Bryophyllum delagoense
- Buddleja davidii
- Calystegia silvatica
- Cardiospermum halicacabum
- Carpobrotus edulis
- Castanea sativa
- Cenchrus setaceus
- Centranthus ruber
- Cestrum elegans
- Cestrum parqui
- Clematis orientalis
- Clerodendrum bungei
- Consolida ajacis
- Convallaria majalis
- Coreopsis basalis
- Crocosmia spp.
- Cyclamen persicum
- Cymbalaria muralis
- Delairea odorata
- Dichondra repens
- Digitalis purpurea
- Dolichandra unguis-cati
- Doronicum orientale
- Echinops exaltatus
- Echium candicans
- Elodea canadensis
- Epiphyllum oxypetalum
- Eriocapitella hupehensis
- Erythranthe moschata
- Eschscholzia californica
- Foeniculum vulgare
- Galega officinalis
- Galinsoga parviflora
- Hedera helix
- Hedera hibernica
- Helianthus annuus
- Helianthus tuberosus
- Hemerocallis fulva
- Heracleum mantegazzianum
- Hesperis matronalis
- Ilex aquifolium
- Impatiens glandulifera
- Impatiens parviflora
- Ipomoea cairica
- Ipomoea indica
- Iris pseudacorus
- Isatis tinctoria
- Juglans regia
- Kalanchoe delagoensis
- Kniphofia uvaria
- Laburnum anagyroides
- Lamiastrum galeobdolon
- Lantana camara
- Lavandula stoechas
- Lespedeza bicolor
- Ligustrum lucidum
- Lilium lancifolium
- Linaria purpurea
- Lonicera maackii
- Lysimachia punctata
- Lythrum salicaria
- Macfadyena unguis-cati
- Melastoma sanguineum
- Monarda punctata
- Nothoscordum gracile
- Nymphaea mexicana
- Olea europaea subsp. cuspidata
- Opuntia ficus-indica
- Oxalis debilis
- Papaver cambricum
- Pelargonium peltatum
- Phlox paniculata
- Physalis alkekengi
- Prunus serotina
- Reynoutria japonica
- Rhododendron ponticum
- Ribes rubrum
- Ricinus communis
- Robinia pseudoacacia
- Rubus hawaiensis
- Ruellia simplex
- Senecio angulatus
- Senecio elegans
- Senna pendula
- Silene armeria
- Solanum lycopersicum
- Sparaxis tricolor
- Stachytarpheta mutabilis
- Sphagneticola trilobata
- Talinum paniculatum
- Thymus praecox
- Tradescantia fluminensis
- Tulipa sylvestris
- Vanilla × tahitensis
- Vinca major
- Vinca minor
- Watsonia meriana

== Gallery ==
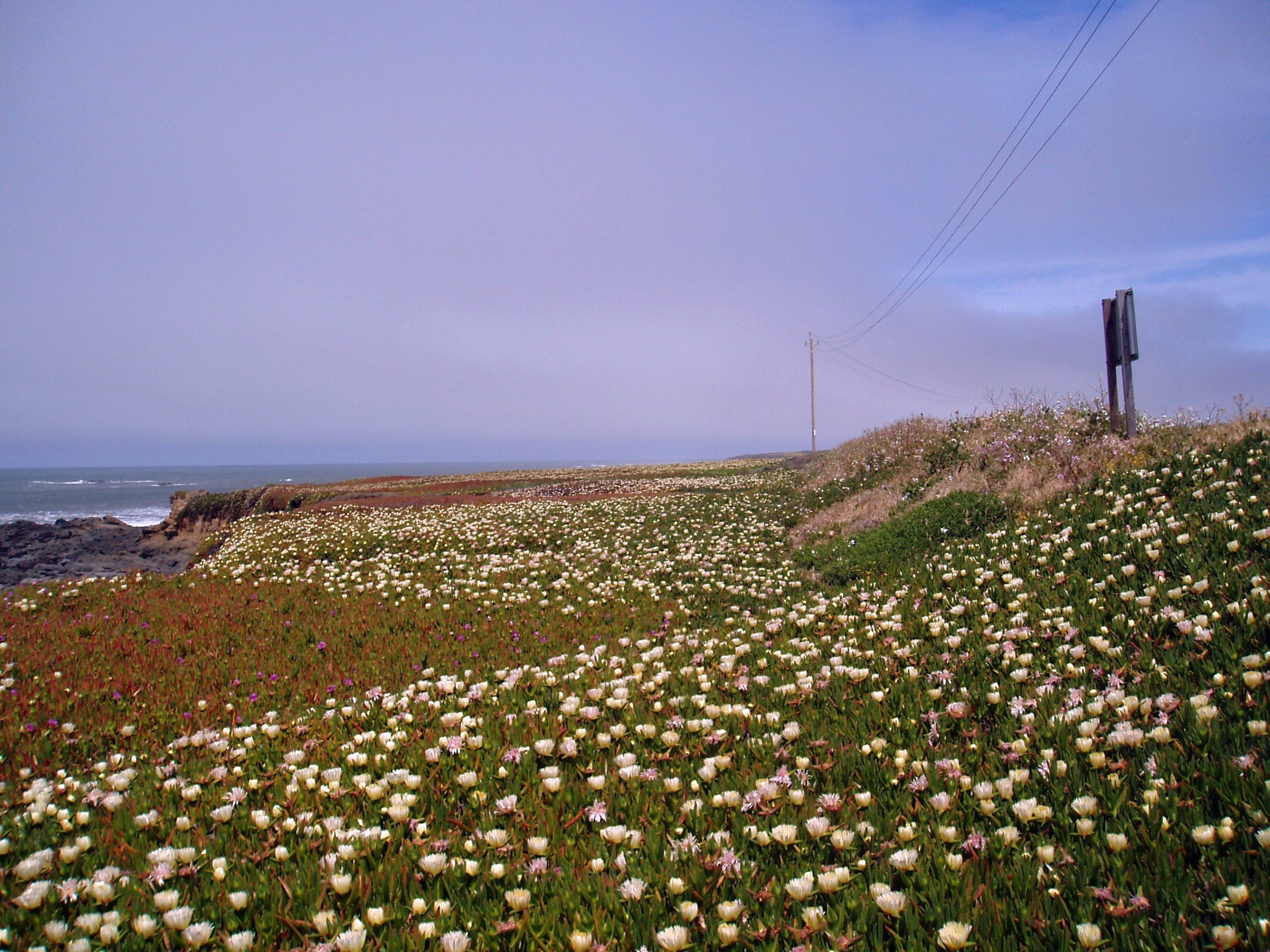
Iceplant refugees along the California Coast

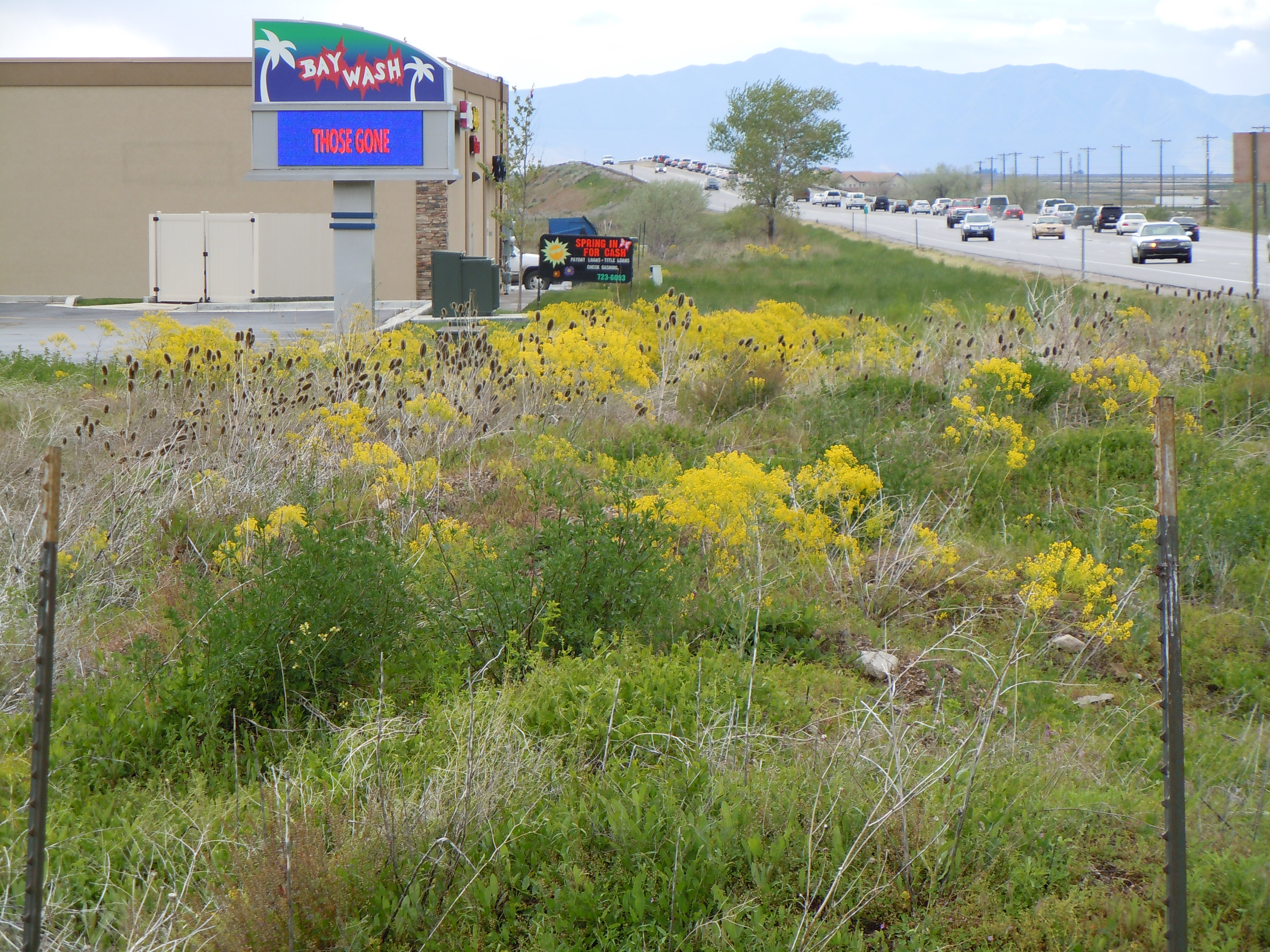
Dyer's woad's escape to disturbed roadsides

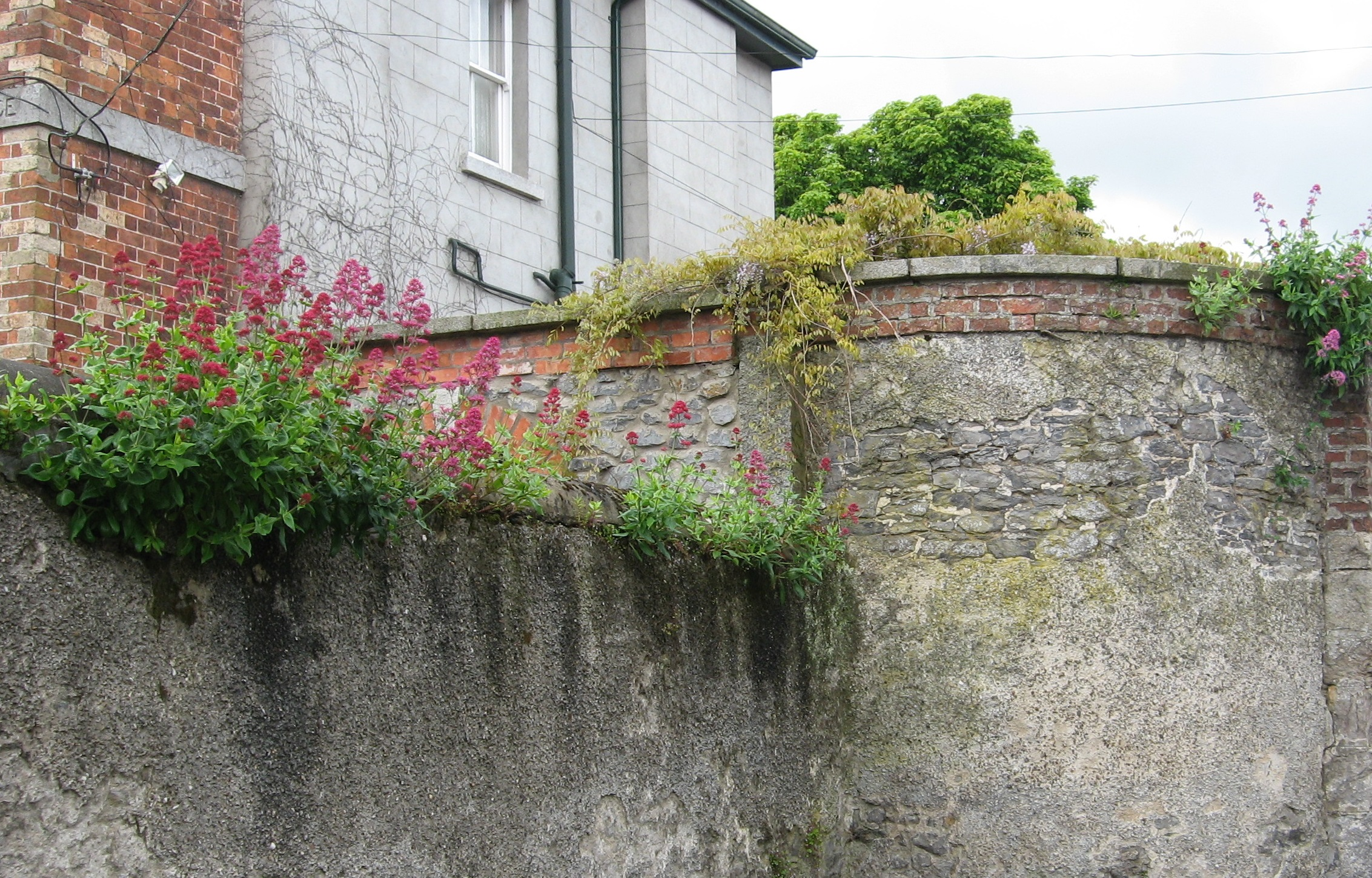
Red valerian finding refuge atop old walls

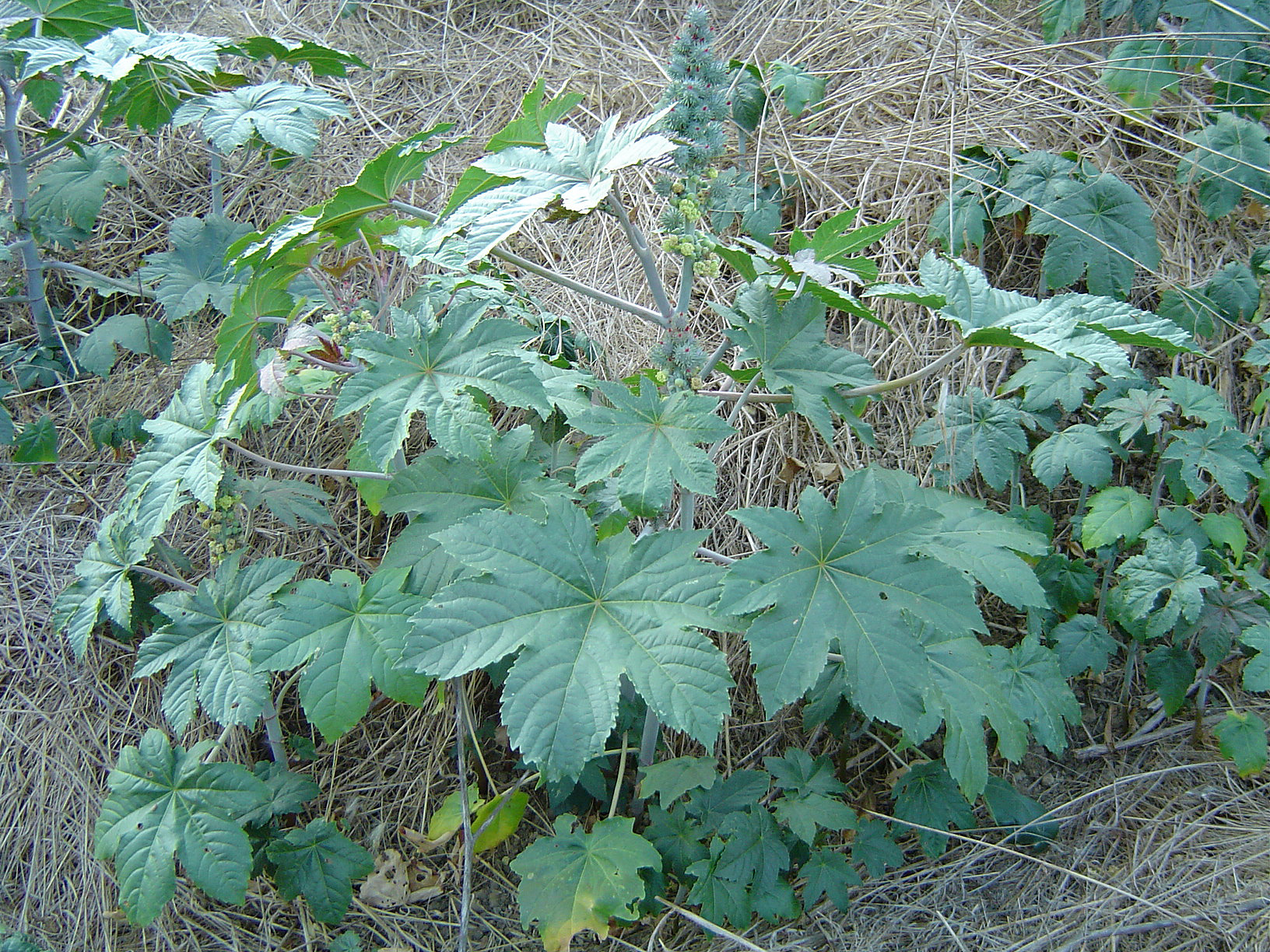
Castor bean usually finds refuge on wastelands

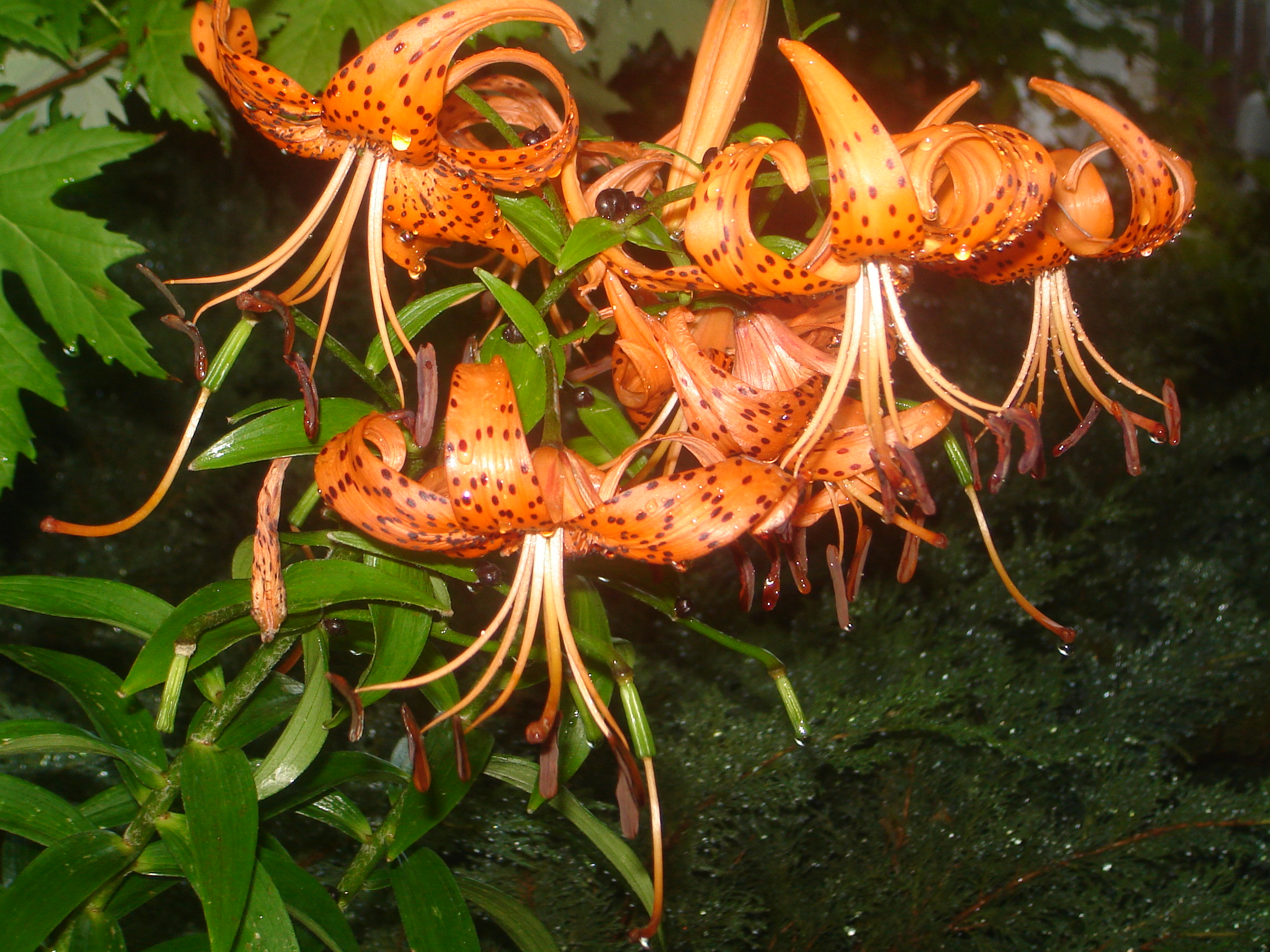
Tiger lily occurs as a garden escapee in Eastern U.S.

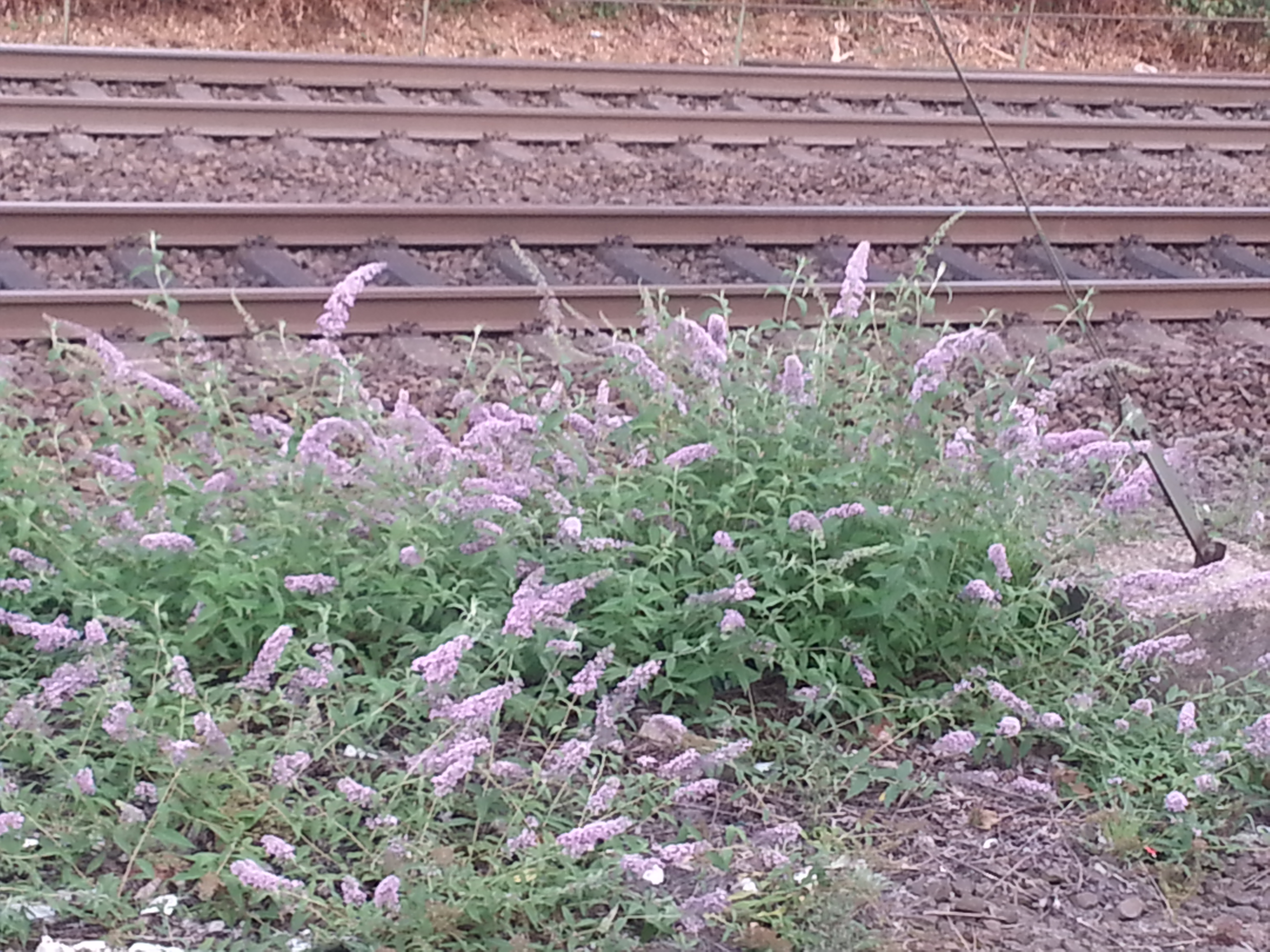
Buddleja self-sown along a railroad

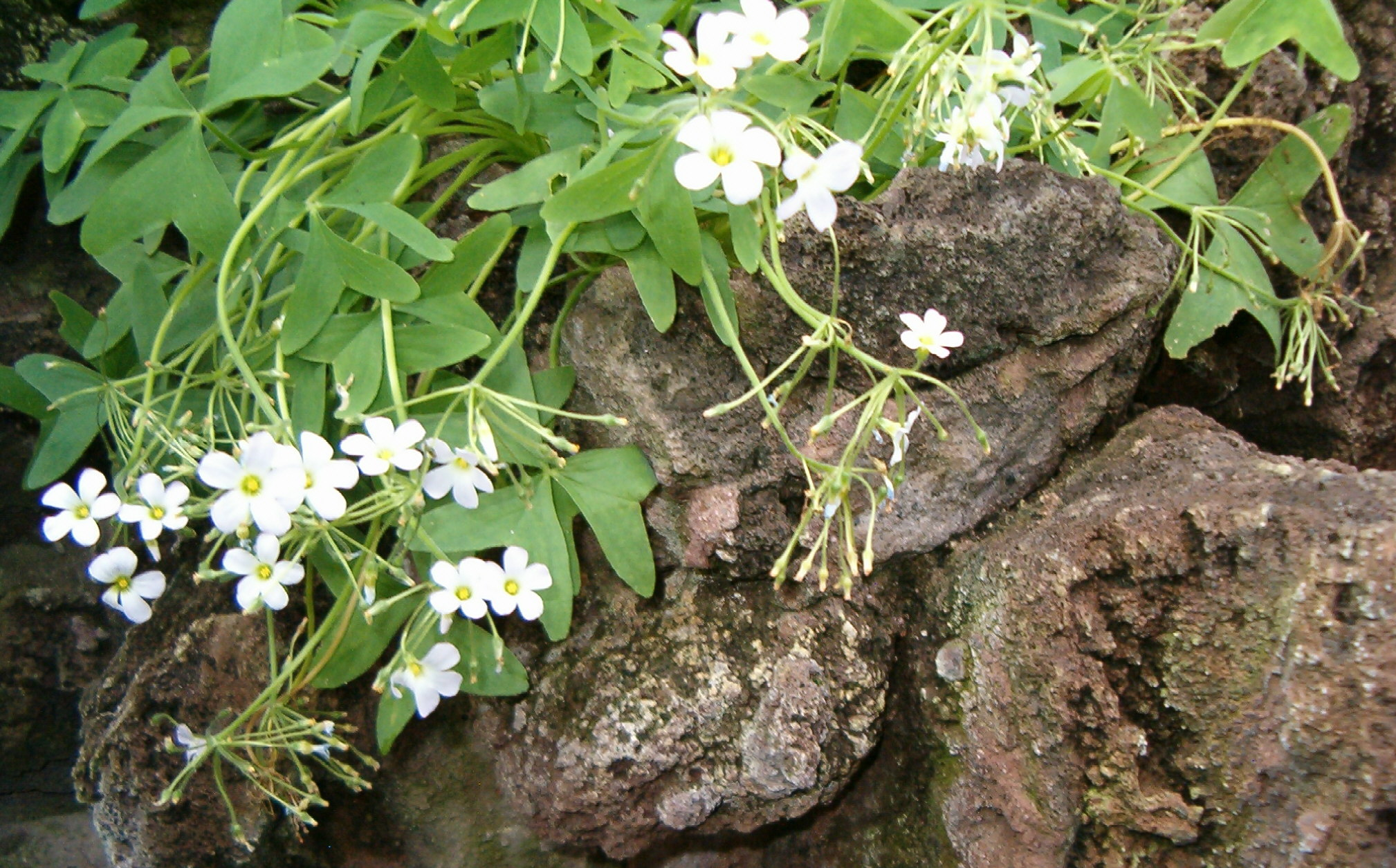
Oxalis latifolia has escaped gardens through seed dispersal.

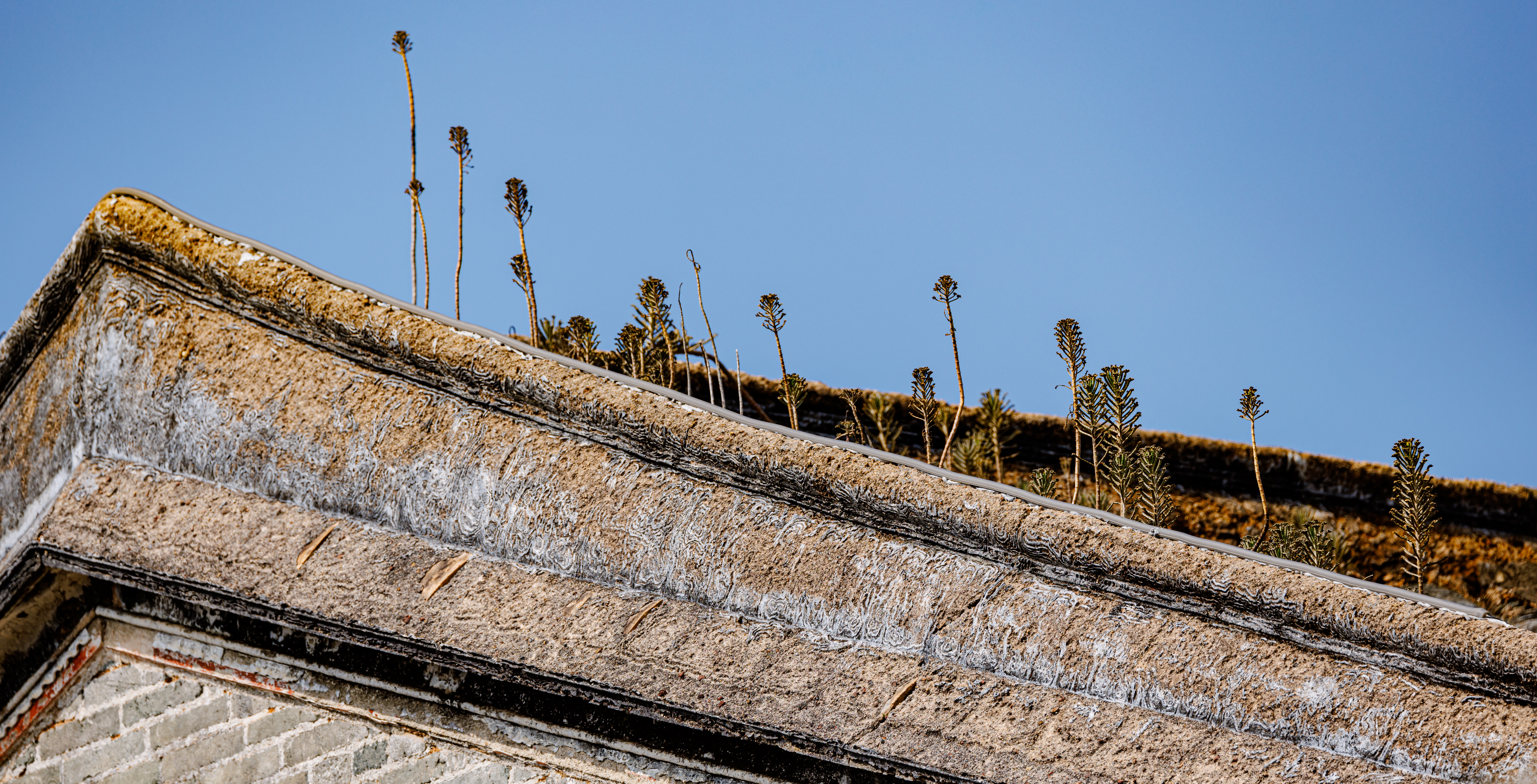
Mother of millions finding refuge in Dapeng Fortress, Shenzhen

== See also ==
- Volunteer plant
- Adventive plant
- Archaeophyte
- Assisted colonization
- Hemerochory
- Neophyte
- Passive rewilding

== Bibliography ==
- Angelika Lüttig, Juliane Kasten (2003): Hagebutte & Co: Blüten, Früchte und Ausbreitung europäischer Pflanzen. Fauna, Nottuln. ISBN 3-93-598090-6.
- Christian Stolz (2013): Archäologische Zeigerpflanzen: Fallbeispiele aus dem Taunus und dem nördlichen Schleswig-Holstein. Plants as indicators for archaeological find sites: Case studies from the Taunus Mts. and from the northern part of Schleswig-Holstein (Germany). Schriften des Arbeitskreises Landes- und Volkskunde 11.
- Herrando-Moraira, S., Nualart, N., Herrando-Moraira, A. et al. Climatic niche characteristics of native and invasive Lilium lancifolium. Sci Rep 9, 14334 (2019). Climatic niche characteristics of native and invasive Lilium lancifolium
