= Onion weed =

"Onion weed" may refer to several species of plant that are either related to onions, have onion-like bulbs or flowers, or smell oniony or garlicky, and that are considered weeds outside their native ranges. These include:

- Allium neapolitanum, Neapolitan garlic.
- Allium triquetrum, three-cornered leek. Native to south-western Europe and north-western Africa, introduced to the British Isles, New Zealand, Turkey, Australia, California, Oregon, and South America.
- Nothoscordum × borbonicum. Native to South America, cosmopolitan weed. Has also been referred to as N. fragrans, N. inodorum, or N. gracile.
- Asphodelus fistulosus. Weed in USA, Australia, New Zealand, and Mexico.
- Trachyandra divaricata, dune onion weed. Native to southern Africa, invasive in Western Australia and South Australia.
- Romulea rosea, also called onion grass or Guildford grass. Native to South Africa; naturalised in Europe, New Zealand, and California; environmental weed in Australia.
