= Bungei =

Bungei may refer to:

- Bungei (magazine), a Japanese literary magazine
- The Bungei Prize, a literary prize of Japan, awarded by Bungei
- Bungeishunjū, a Japanese publishing company known for its literary magazine of the same name
- Wilfred Bungei, Kenyan middle-distance runner
- Clerodendrum bungei, an ornamental shrub native to China
