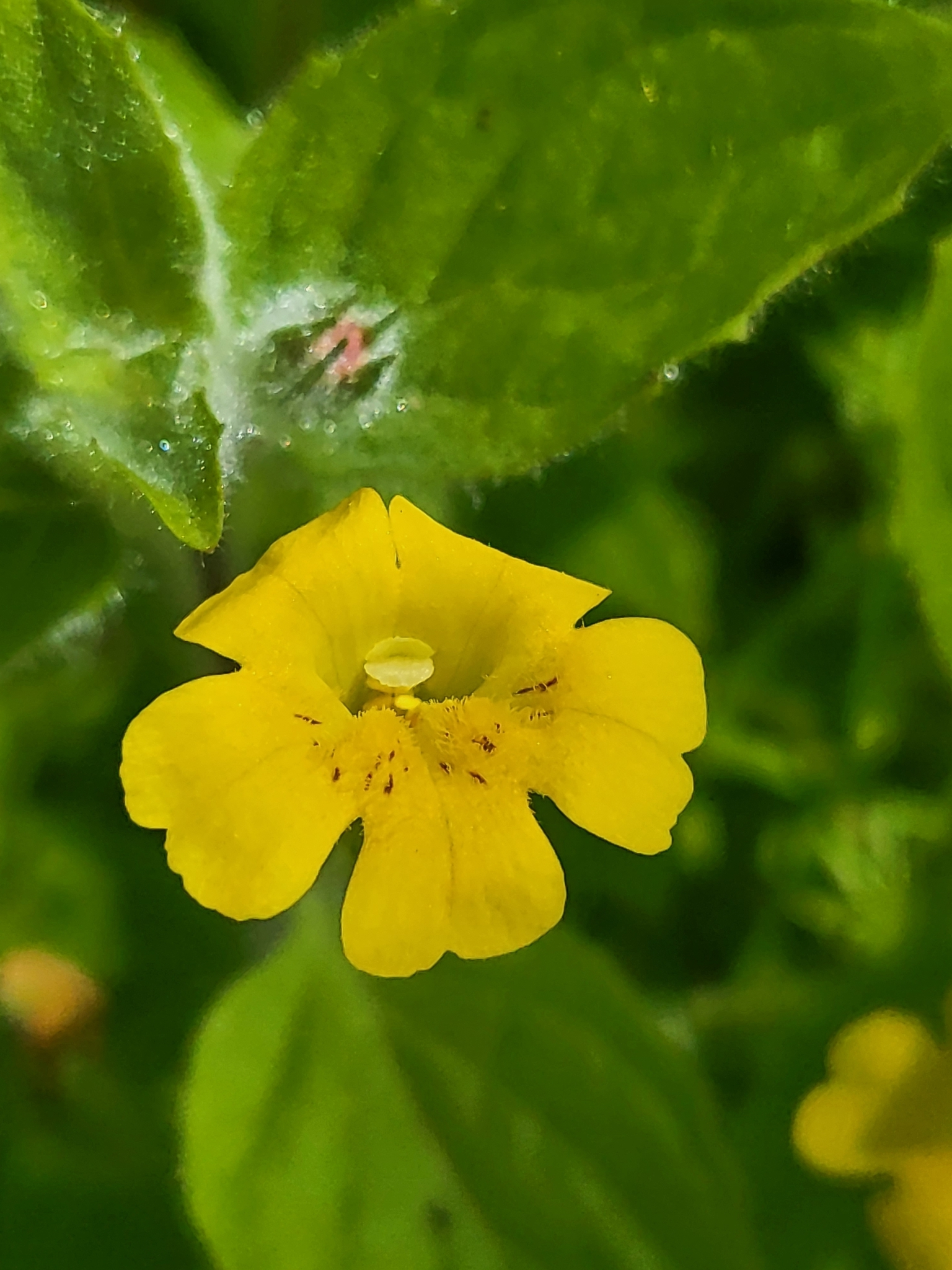

Conservation status
- Least Concern (IUCN 3.1)

- Secure (NatureServe)

Scientific classification
- Kingdom: Plantae
- Clade: Embryophytes
- Clade: Tracheophytes
- Clade: Angiosperms
- Clade: Eudicots
- Clade: Asterids
- Order: Lamiales
- Family: Phrymaceae
- Genus: Erythranthe
- Species: E. moschata

Binomial name
- Erythranthe moschata (Douglas ex Lindl.) G.L.Nesom

Synonyms
- Synonymy: Erythranthe inodora (Greene) G.L.Nesom; Erythranthe moniliformis (Greene) G.L.Nesom; Mimulus acutidens Reiche, nom. illeg. homonym. post.; Mimulus crinitus A.L.Grant; Mimulus dentatus var. gracilis A.Gray; Mimulus guttatus var. moschatus (Douglas ex Lindl.) Prov.; Mimulus inodorus Greene; Mimulus leibergii A.L.Grant; Mimulus macranthus Pennell; Mimulus moniliformis Greene; Mimulus moschatus Douglas ex Lindl.; Mimulus moschatus flore-pleno Pynaert; Mimulus moschatus var. longiflorus A.Gray; Mimulus moschatus var. moniliformis (Greene) Munz; Mimulus moschatus var. pallidiflorus Suksd.

= Erythranthe moschata =

Plant species in the lopseed family

Erythranthe moschata is a species of monkeyflower known by the common names muskflower, musk monkeyflower, and formerly as the common musk, eyebright and musk plant. It was formerly known as Mimulus moschatus.

== Distribution and habitat ==
It is native to western North America from British Columbia to California to the Rocky Mountains, where it grows in moist meadows and stream banks.

It also occurs in eastern North America where it may be native or introduced. It is known from Chile and parts of Europe, including England and Finland, where it grows wild after having escaped cultivation.

== Description ==
This is a rhizomatous perennial herb which is hairless to hairy, sometimes slimy in texture, and generally musky in scent. It is variable in appearance. The prostrate or upright stem grows up to 30 centimeters long. The oppositely arranged leaves are mostly oval in shape and may reach 6 centimeters long. The tubular flower is yellow in color, its tube just a few millimeters wide and widening at the lobed mouth. It may be up to 2.6 centimeters long.

== Loss of scent ==
Erythranthe moschata was widely grown and sold commercially in Victorian times for its fragrance, and is well known for the story that all cultivated and known wild specimens simultaneously lost their previous strong musk scent around the year 1913. Writing in 1934 in the journal Nature, E. Hardy described a Lancashire nurseryman, Thomas Wilkinson, who in 1898 found that his plants developed a "rank, leafy smell"; five years later, after leaving the trade, he noticed that plants then on sale were scentless. While it was sometimes claimed that strongly scented plants could still be found in the wild, Arthur William Hill, in a 1930 article in The Gardeners' Chronicle, presented evidence from British Columbia claiming that wild populations had also lost their scent.

A variety of suggestions were put forward for a solution to the mystery, such as that the scent of the original cultivated form had been a rare recessive feature, which later disappeared as a result of uncontrolled pollination or the introduction of other genes from the wild population. Other explanations were given based on changes in climate, that humans had lost the ability to detect the smell, that the scent had been produced by a parasite, or that the loss of scent was a myth. W.B. Gourlay (1947) suggested that the phenomenon could be explained if the highly scented cultivated form had been reproduced vegetatively from a single aberrant plant, first raised in England from the original batch of seed, and later replaced by unscented plants grown from other sources of seed. David Douglas first described the species and in 1826 near Fort Vancouver collected seed from which the first examples in England were raised; it is notable that he made no reference to a strong musk scent in his field notes. Moreover, there are references as early as 1917 to plants in the wild having a wide range of characteristics between scentless and strongly scented, with the latter being "very much the exception". During the 1920s and 1930s, at the height of botanists' interest in the 'lost scent' phenomenon, there were several reports of strongly-scented moschatus specimens being discovered in the wild, such as in 1931 on Texada Island, British Columbia.

== Taxonomy ==
Erythranthe moschata was given its scientific name in 1828 by John Lindley who credited work by David Douglas. In 2012 it was moved to the genus Erythranthe by Guy L. Nesom. Together with its genus it is part of the family Phrymaceae. The species has 15 synonyms according to Plants of the World Online.

Table of Synonyms
Name	Year	Rank	Notes
Erythranthe inodora (Greene) G.L.Nesom	2012	species	= het.
Erythranthe moniliformis (Greene) G.L.Nesom	2012	species	= het.
Mimulus acutidens Reiche	1911	species	= het., nom. illeg.
Mimulus crinitus A.L.Grant	1924	species	= het.
Mimulus dentatus var. gracilis A.Gray	1882	variety	= het.
Mimulus guttatus var. moschatus (Douglas ex Lindl.) Prov.	1862	variety	≡ hom.
Mimulus inodorus Greene	1885	species	= het.
Mimulus leibergii A.L.Grant	1924	species	= het.
Mimulus macranthus Pennell	1947	species	= het.
Mimulus moniliformis Greene	1884	species	= het.
Mimulus moschatus Douglas ex Lindl.	1828	species	≡ hom.
Mimulus moschatus flore-pleno Pynaert	1893		= het., contrary to Art. 23.6. (ICN, 2012)
Mimulus moschatus var. longiflorus A.Gray	1878	variety	= het.
Mimulus moschatus var. moniliformis (Greene) Munz	1958	variety	= het.
Mimulus moschatus var. pallidiflorus Suksd.	1900	variety	= het.
Notes: ≡ homotypic synonym; = heterotypic synonym
