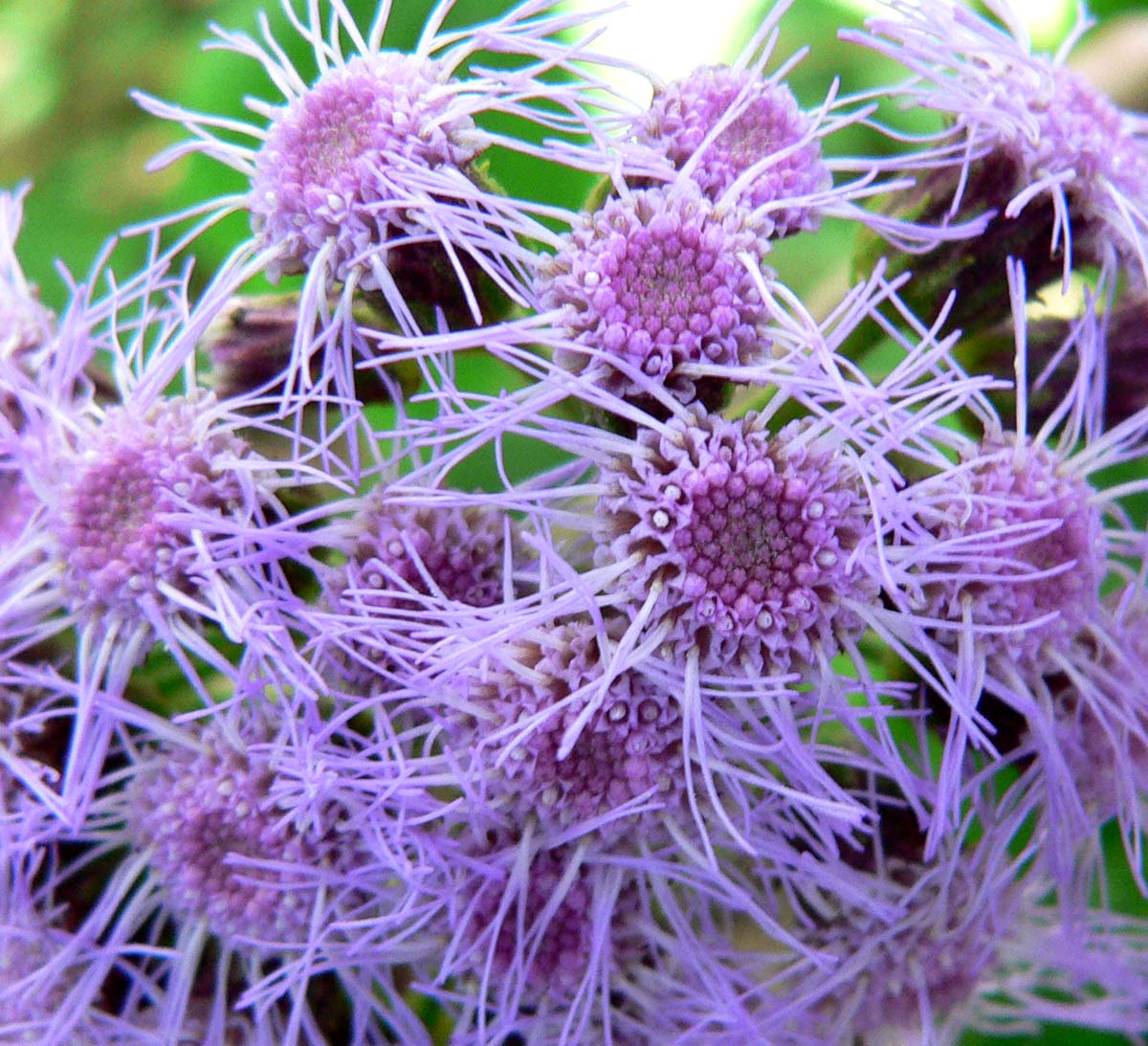

Scientific classification
- Kingdom: Plantae
- Clade: Tracheophytes
- Clade: Angiosperms
- Clade: Eudicots
- Clade: Asterids
- Order: Asterales
- Family: Asteraceae
- Genus: Bartlettina
- Species: B. sordida

Binomial name
- Bartlettina sordida (Less.) R.M.King & H.Rob.

Synonyms
- Eupatorium megalophyllum (Lem.) N.E. Br. Eupatorium sordidum

= Bartlettina sordida =

Species of flowering plant

Bartlettina sordida, the purple torch, bartlettina, or blue mist flower, is a flowering plant which is endemic to cloud forest habitats in Mexico. It was formerly classified in the genus Eupatorium.

== Description ==
The plant is an evergreen, erect shrub, growing to 8 feet (2.4 m) tall and 4 feet (1.2 m) wide.

Bartlettina sordida has reddish-purple branches clothed in slightly rough, dark green leaves with prominent venation and paler undersides. The leaves are very large, up to 10 inches (25 cm) longs and 8 inches (20 cm) wide.

The inflorescence is a terminal corymbose panicle, 20–30 cm across. The large clusters of scented flowers appear in spring, mauve to lilac to magenta-blue in color. The clusters have a bursting fireworks appearance. The seed has a fluffy pappus and is easily dispersed by wind.

== Cultivation ==
Bartlettina sordida is cultivated as an ornamental plant for use in gardens and parks. They are pollinator plants, attractive to butterflies.

The plant prefers bright dappled shade, and moist, well draining soils high in organic matter. The plant is frost tender below 25/30 °F (1/3 °C). Propagation is via seed, or semihardwood cuttings taken in autumn and winter or from prunings taken after flowering in late spring.

The species has escaped from gardens in parts of Australia, and can become a weed and invasive species in compatible habitats where there is ample moisture.

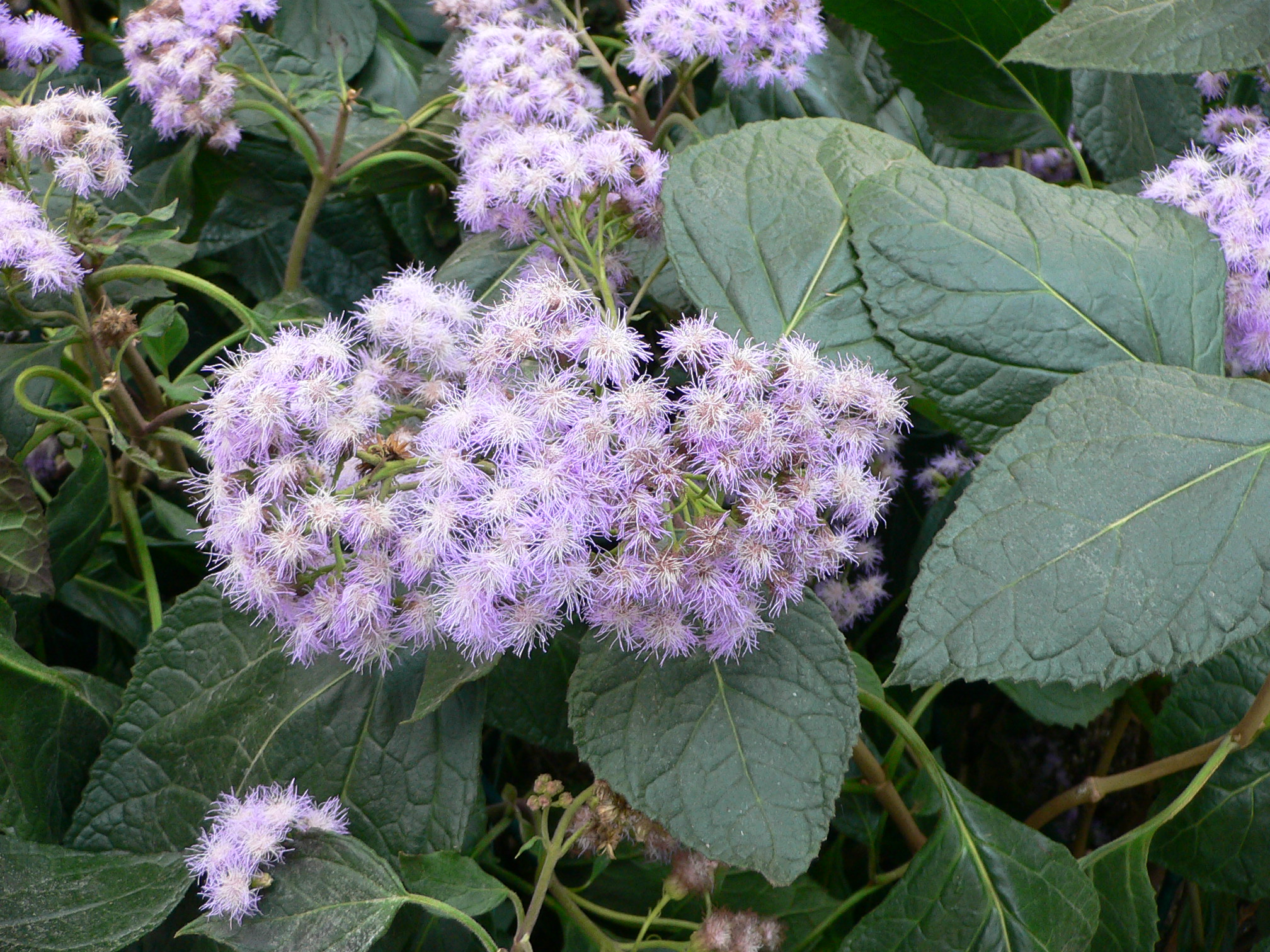

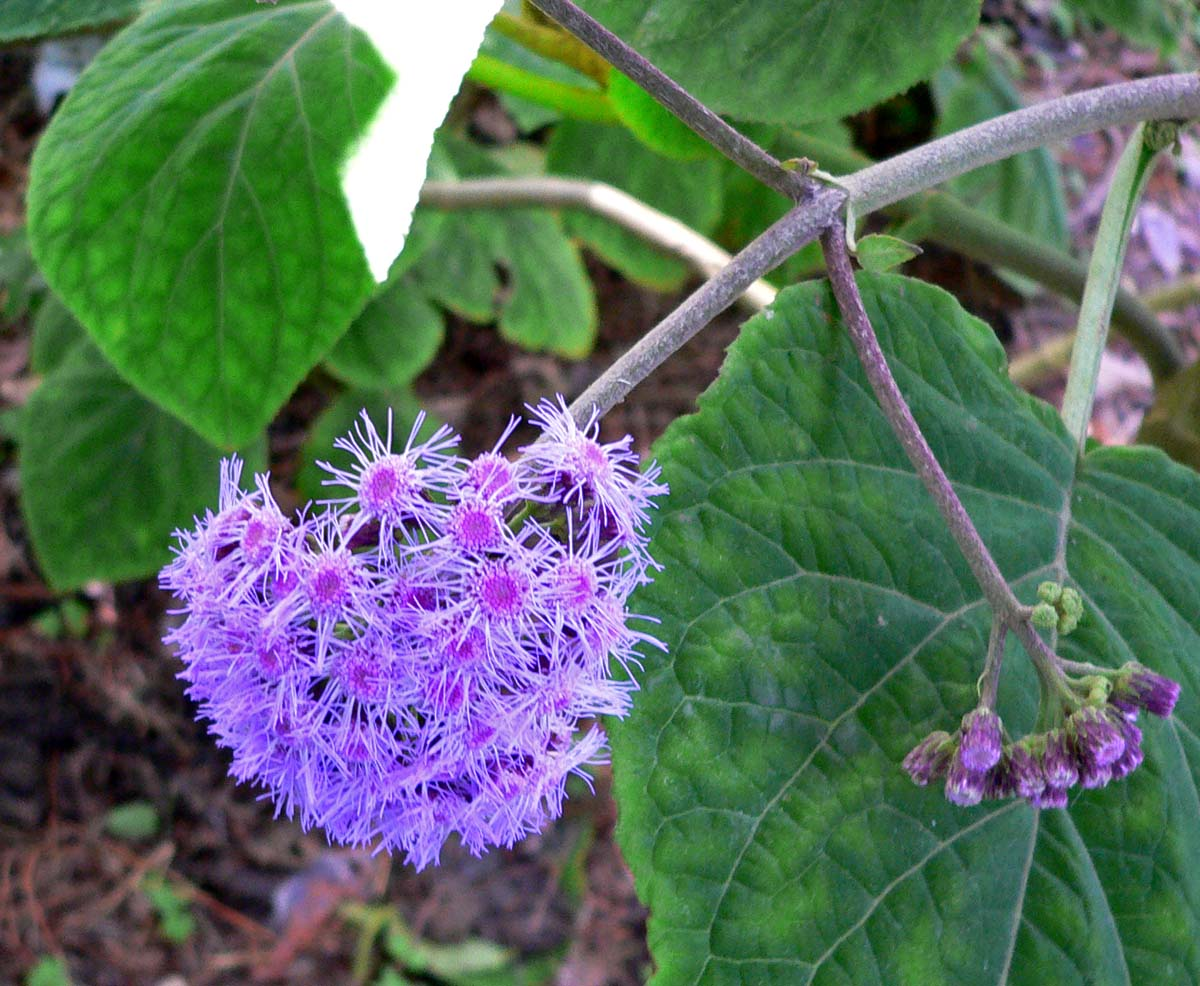
