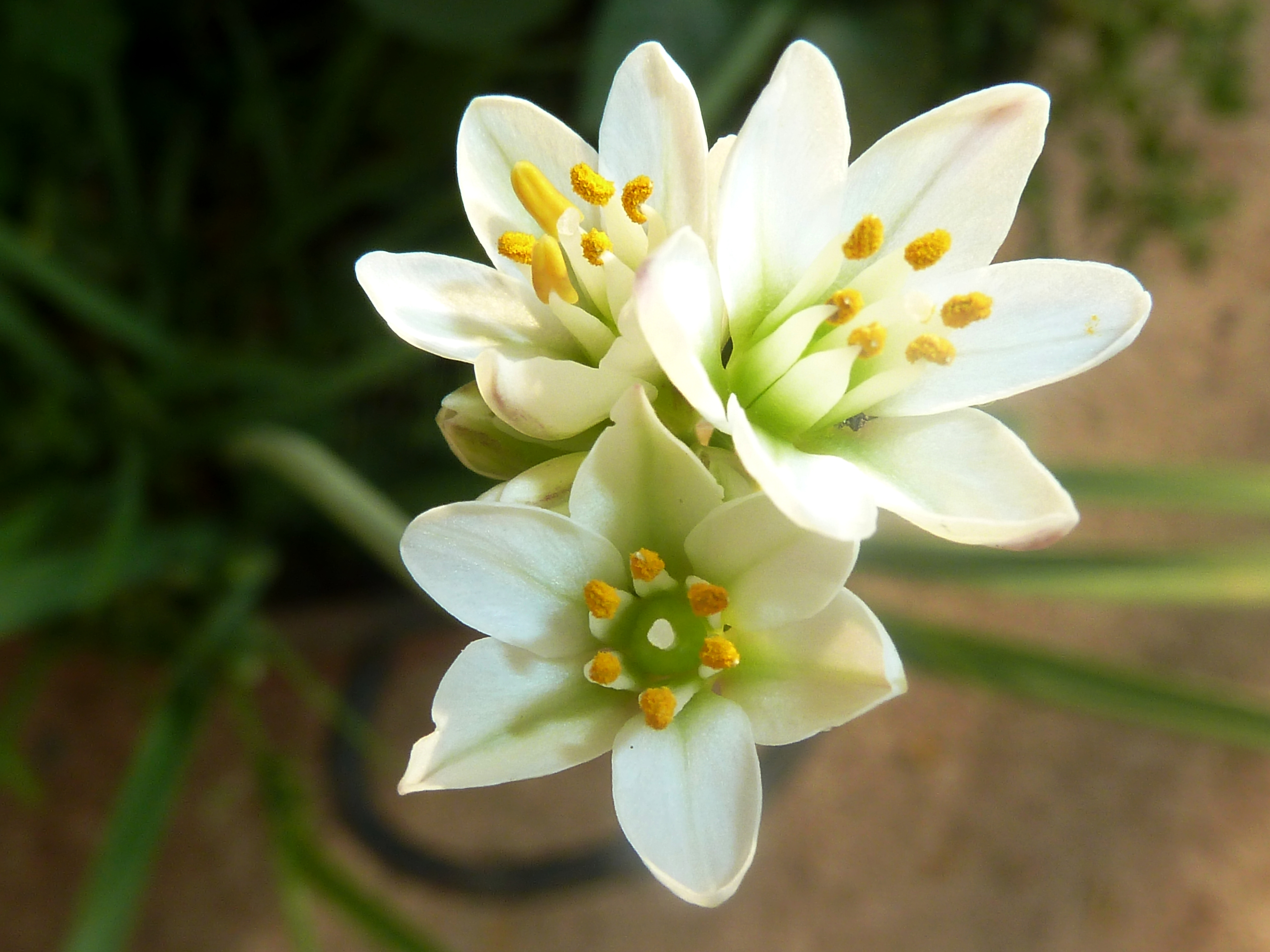

Scientific classification
- Kingdom: Plantae
- Clade: Tracheophytes
- Clade: Angiosperms
- Clade: Monocots
- Order: Asparagales
- Family: Amaryllidaceae
- Subfamily: Allioideae
- Genus: Nothoscordum
- Species: N. × borbonicum

Binomial name
- Nothoscordum × borbonicum Kunth

= Nothoscordum × borbonicum =

Species of flowering plant

Nothoscordum × borbonicum, also known as honeybells, fragrant false garlic and onion weed, is a bulbous perennial. It has become naturalized as a nearly cosmopolitan weed. The whitish flowers are sweetly scented. It is a hybrid between N. entrerianum and N. gracile.

The binomial names Nothoscordum fragrans and Nothoscordum gracile have also been applied to this plant.
