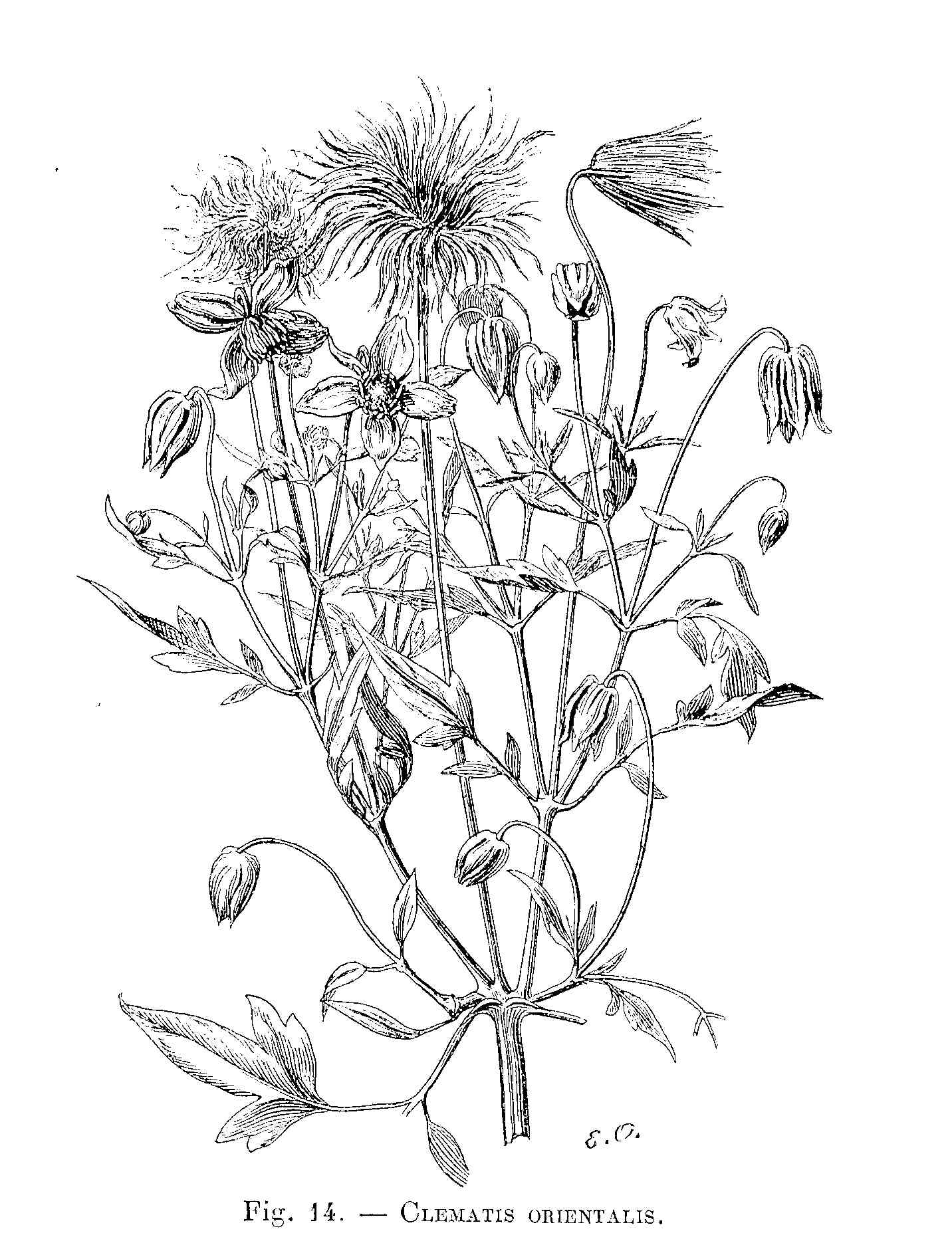

Scientific classification
- Kingdom: Plantae
- Clade: Tracheophytes
- Clade: Angiosperms
- Clade: Eudicots
- Order: Ranunculales
- Family: Ranunculaceae
- Genus: Clematis
- Species: C. orientalis

Binomial name
- Clematis orientalis L.

= Clematis orientalis =

Species of flowering plant in the buttercup family

Clematis orientalis is a deciduous vine or scrambling shrub in the buttercup family Ranunculaceae, that originates from Asia and Eastern Europe. It was brought to the United States as an ornamental plant but escaped cultivation leading to its classification as a noxious weed in some states. Common names for C. orientalis include Chinese clematis, Oriental virginsbower, orange peel, and orange peel clematis.

== Etymology ==
The name of the genus Clematis is a derivation of the Ancient Greek word "clématis", which means "climbing". This is a description of the tendency that species show to be climbers.

== Description ==
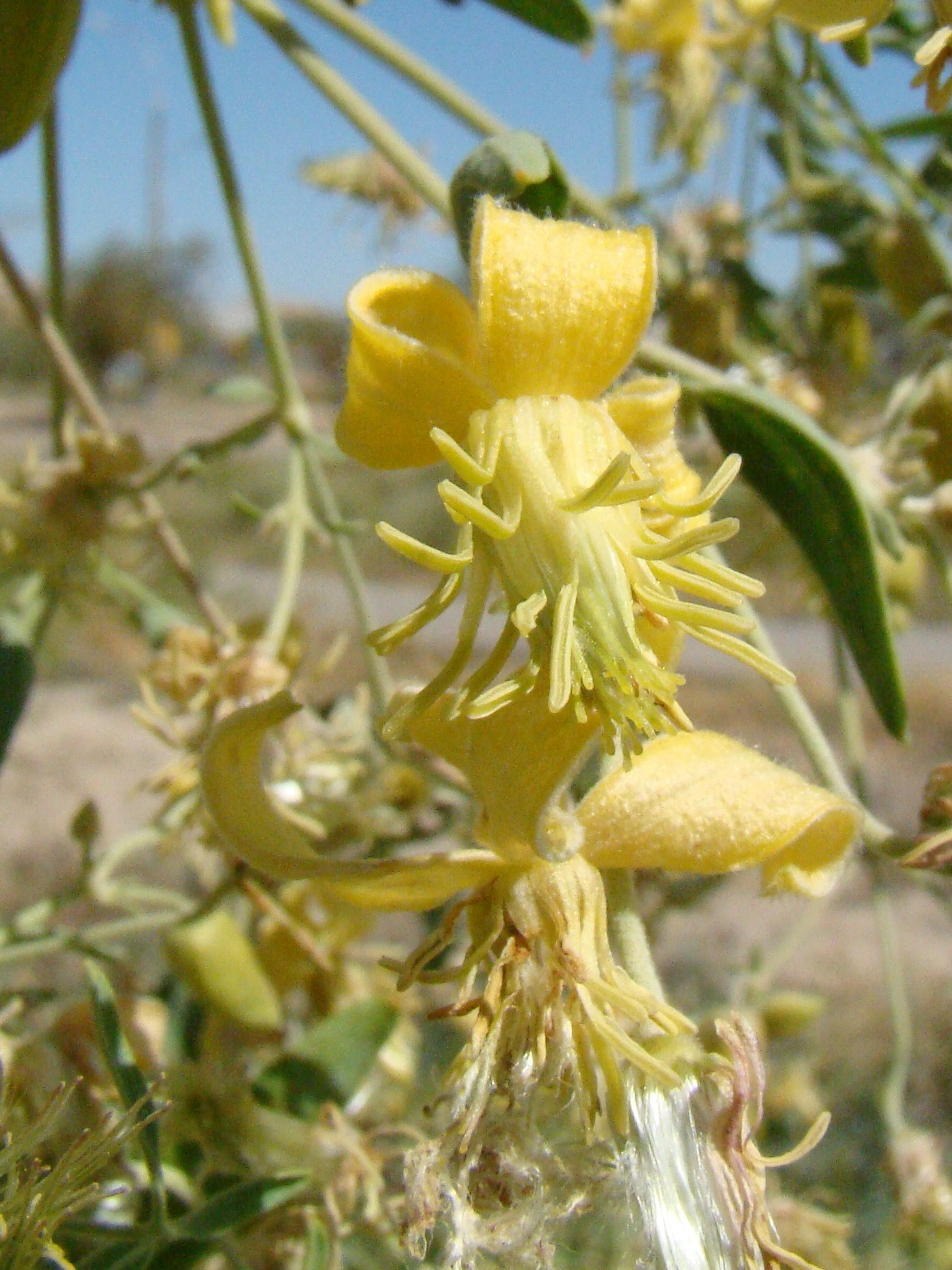
Clematis orientalis mature flower: yellow sepals curled back

Clematis orientalis is a deciduous scrambling shrub that grows to attach to its environment by means of tendril-like stems. It grows densely at a rate of least a meter per year.

=== Stem ===
The stems are slender and tendril-like. It grows to heights of about 2–8 meters, with a thickness up to 7 cm. The stems are covered with gray-brown bark, with the inner bark being green. The vines twine to rocks, other plants, and other things in its environment as it climbs.

=== Flower ===
C. orientalis flowers can be solitary or grow in clusters in a cyme inflorescence. Most noticeable about the flower is the four yellow to yellow-orange sepals, which are often mistaken for its petals. The sepals are ovate-lanceolate to elliptic, wide-spreading and tend to curl back at its maturity. The sepals reaches widths of 2–3 cm and lengths of 6–9 cm. No hair abaxial of sepal. The flower is hermaphroditic. The style is 3–10 cm long and remains attached to the achene, acting as its wings. The flower has a strong fragrance.

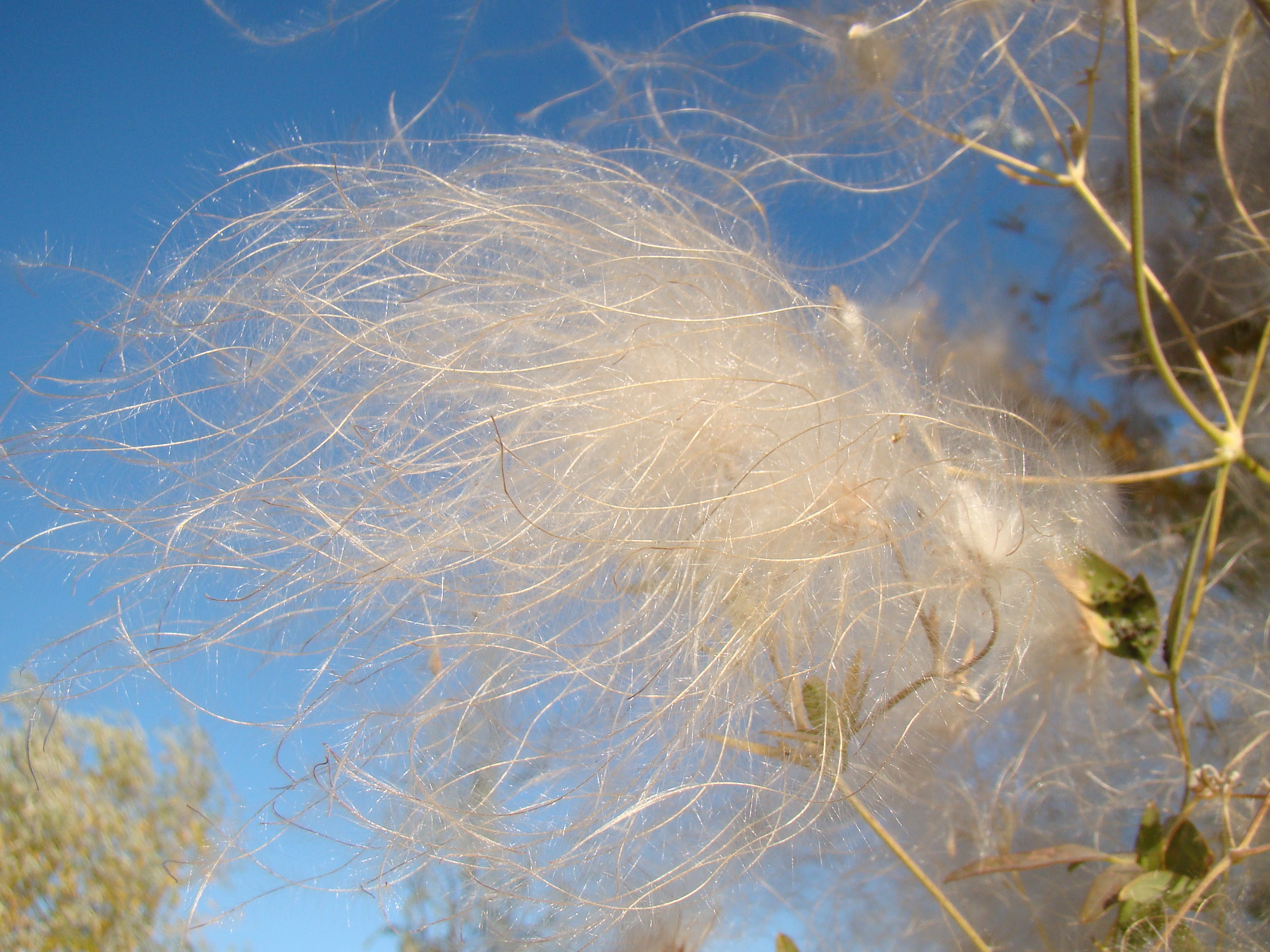
Clematis orientalis seedhead

=== Leaf ===
The leaves are pinnately compound, with 3 to 7 leaflets per leaf. The leaflets are coarsely-toothed to entire or ovate to linear-lanceolate and 1–5 cm long. The leaves have a gray-green color. The leaves have an opposite arrangement on the stem.

=== Root ===
C. orientalis roots are weak and flexible with branching finer roots of tan to orange-tan coloring.

== Ecology ==
Clematis orientalis prefers well-drained soils. There is no preference of soil texture though does well on chalky soil. Can tolerate a range of alkaline or acidic soils.

It has a preference for sunny habitats but has shown a tolerance for partially shaded areas. In the United States, it is found in shrublands, riverbanks, gullies, sand depressions, riparian forests in hot, dry valleys and desert and semidesert areas. It can grow at elevations of 400 to 3,800 meters.

== Distribution ==
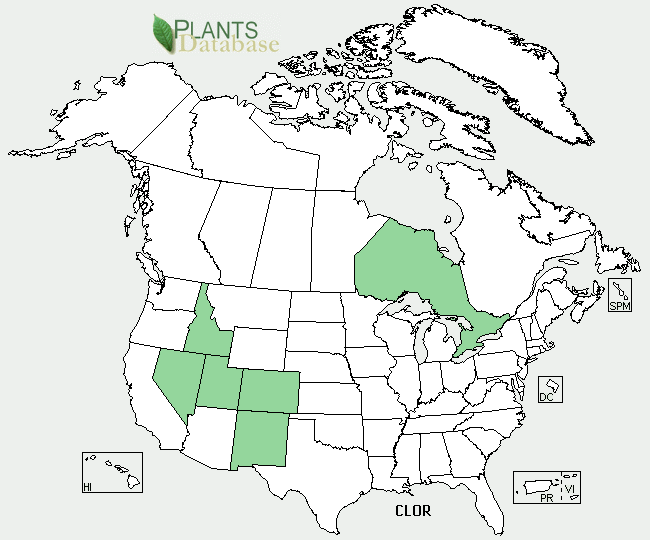
Distribution of Clematis orientalis in the United States and Canada

Clematis orientalis is native to Asia and Central Europe, specifically from Turkey through West Asia to the Korean Peninsula, south to Iran, and Northwest India.

Originally planted in the United States as an ornamental plant, it escaped from cultivation and became naturalized to Nevada, Idaho, Utah, Colorado, New Mexico, Oregon, and Ontario (Canada).

== Reproduction ==
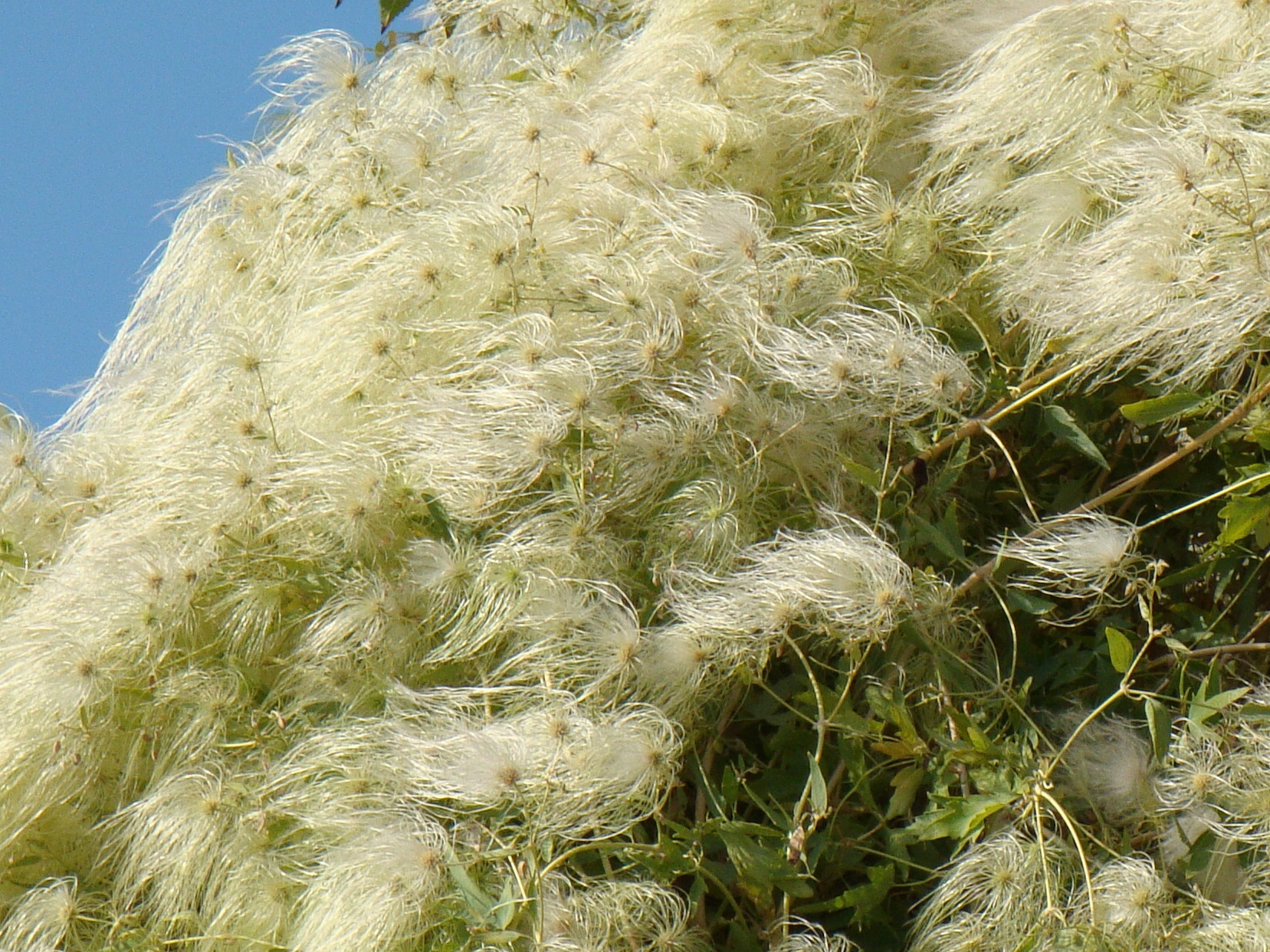
Multiple Clematis orientalis seedheads

C. orientalis flowers appear from August to late September. The flowers and fruits are present at the same time. Pollination is carried out by flies and bees.

Seedheads are rounded clusters of fluffy winged seeds, resembling pom poms that disperse over winter and early spring. The seeds are primarily dispersed by the wind.

== Impact on habitat ==
Since C. orientalis is a vine, it grows over rocks, fences, and other plants. It has escaped cultivation and naturalized. It is classified as a noxious weed by some states. C. orientalis can cover young trees and bushes, killing them. It has the ability to out-compete native shrubby or herbaceous species.

== Uses ==
Clematis orientalis is grown as an ornamental plant. It is also used as an antiseptic and refrigerant. This plant has been documented in Ancient Chinese medicine to treat dog bites and to treat ulcerated throats by gargling its infusion.
