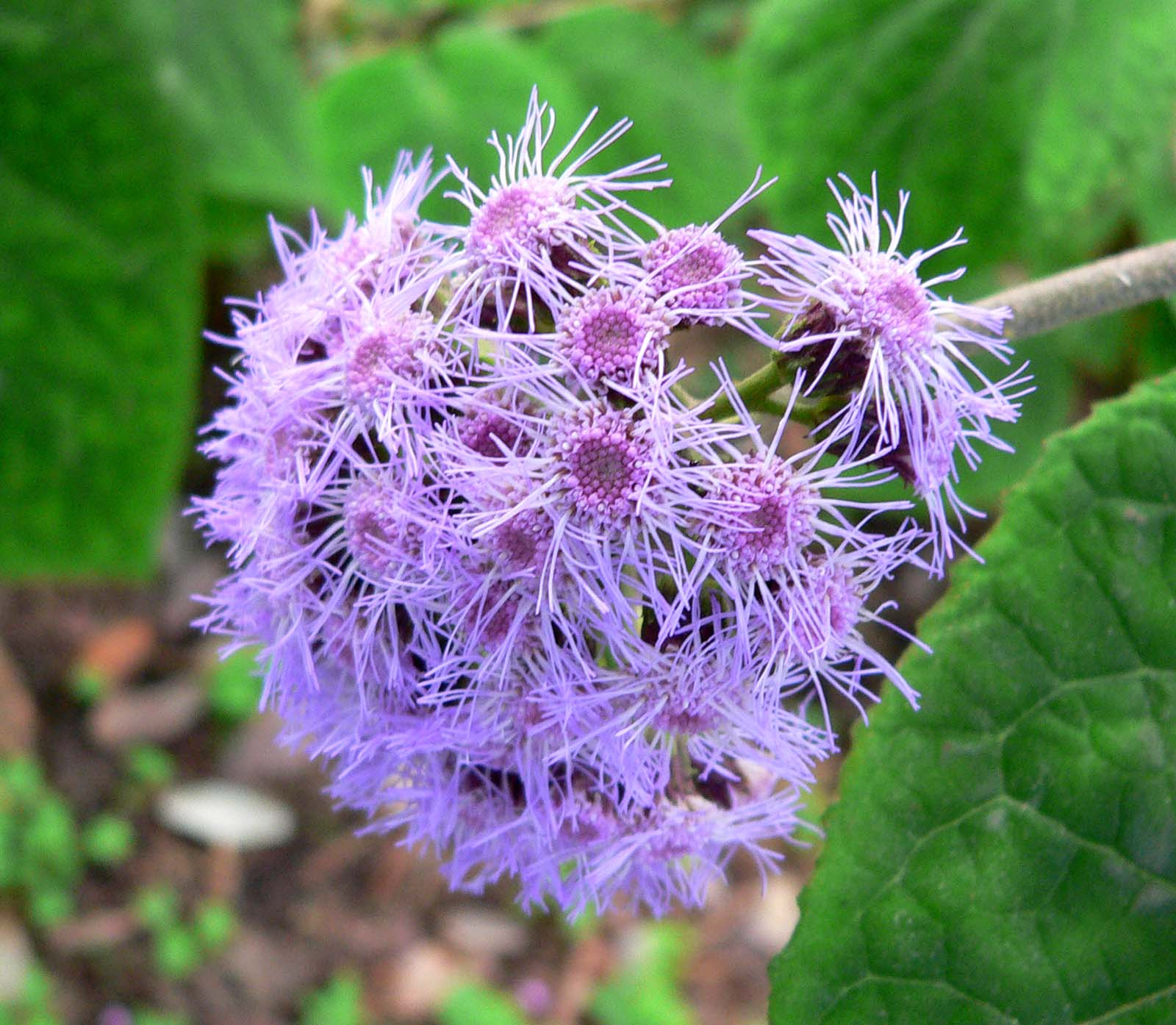
- Bartlettina sordida

Scientific classification
- Kingdom: Plantae
- Clade: Embryophytes
- Clade: Tracheophytes
- Clade: Spermatophytes
- Clade: Angiosperms
- Clade: Eudicots
- Clade: Asterids
- Order: Asterales
- Family: Asteraceae
- Subfamily: Asteroideae
- Tribe: Eupatorieae
- Genus: Bartlettina; R.King & H.Rob.

Synonyms
- Neobartlettia R.M. King & H. Rob. 1971, illegitimate homonym, not Schltr. 1920 (Orchidaceae )

= Bartlettina =

Genus of flowering plants

Bartlettina is a genus of flowering plants in the family Asteraceae. They are native to tropical regions of Mesoamerica and South America. The genus was erected to house several plants separated from genus Eupatorium.

These are shrubs or perennial herbs with woody bases. The oppositely arranged leaves have smooth or serrated edges. The flower heads contain tubular florets.

The best known species may be the blue mist flower (B. sordida), which is cultivated as an ornamental plant and has become naturalized outside its native range.

Species

- Bartlettina breedlovei
- Bartlettina brevipetiolata
- Bartlettina calderonii
- Bartlettina campii
- Bartlettina chiriquensis
- Bartlettina cleefii
- Bartlettina constipatiflora
- Bartlettina cronquistii
- Bartlettina hastifera
- Bartlettina hemisphaerica
- Bartlettina hintonii
- Bartlettina hylobia
- Bartlettina iodandra
- Bartlettina juxtlahuaca
- Bartlettina karwinskiana
- Bartlettina karwinskiana (DC.) R.M.King & H.Rob. – formerly Neurolaena tenuifolia Sch.Bip. ex Klatt
- Bartlettina lanicaulis
- Bartlettina liesneri
- Bartlettina luxii
- Bartlettina macdougallii
- Bartlettina macrocephala
- Bartlettina macromeris
- Bartlettina maxonii
- Bartlettina montigena
- Bartlettina oresbia
- Bartlettina oresbioides
- Bartlettina ornata
- Bartlettina paezensis
- Bartlettina pansamalensis
- Bartlettina perezioides
- Bartlettina pinabetensis
- Bartlettina platyphylla
- Bartlettina prionophylla
- Bartlettina serboana
- Bartlettina silvicola
- Bartlettina sordida
- Bartlettina tamaulipana
- Bartlettina tenorae
- Bartlettina tuerckheimii
- Bartlettina williamsii
- Bartlettina xalapana
- Bartlettina yaharana

formerly included

- Bartlettina ehrenbergii (Hemsl.) R.M.King & H.Rob., Synonym of Bartlettina macrocephala (Benth.) R.M.King & H.Rob.
- Bartlettina lanicaulis (B.L.Rob.) B.L.Turner, Synonym of Critonia lanicaulis (B.L.Rob.) R.M.King & H.Rob.
- Bartlettina ruae (Standl.) R.M.King & H.Rob., Synonym of Bartlettina pansamalensis (B.L.Rob.) R.M.King & H.Rob.
