= Bartlettina campii =

Conservation status
- Endangered (IUCN 3.1)

Scientific classification
- Kingdom: Plantae
- Clade: Tracheophytes
- Clade: Angiosperms
- Clade: Eudicots
- Clade: Asterids
- Order: Asterales
- Family: Asteraceae
- Genus: Bartlettina
- Species: B. campii

Binomial name
- Bartlettina campii R.M.King & H.Rob.

Species of flowering plant

Bartlettina campii is a species of flowering plant in the family Asteraceae. It is endemic to Ecuador, where it is known from only one collection made in 1945 on the eastern slopes of the Andes in Morona-Santiago Province. It is a liana collected from mountain forest habitat.
