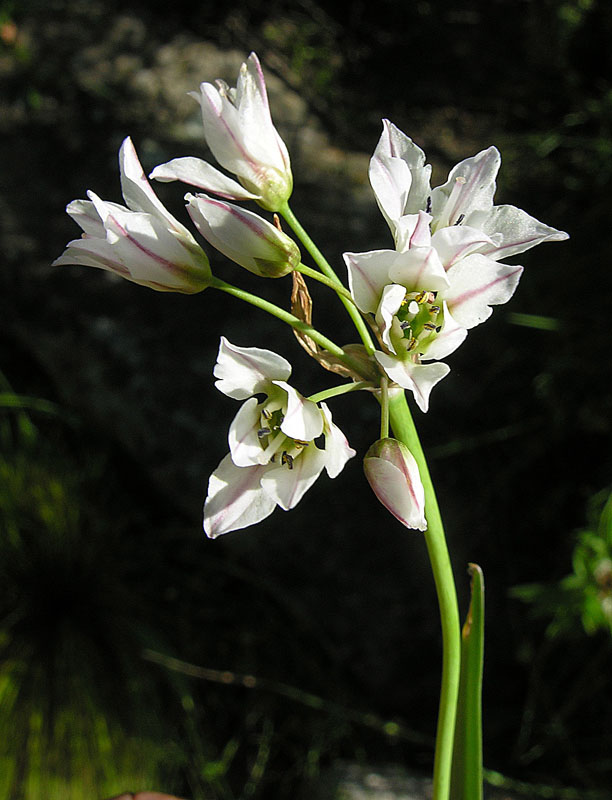

Scientific classification
- Kingdom: Plantae
- Clade: Tracheophytes
- Clade: Angiosperms
- Clade: Monocots
- Order: Asparagales
- Family: Amaryllidaceae
- Subfamily: Allioideae
- Genus: Nothoscordum
- Species: N. gracile

Binomial name
- Nothoscordum gracile (Aiton) Stearn

Synonyms
- Milla macrostemon gracilis Maligia gracilis (Aiton) Raf. Allium gracile Aiton

= Nothoscordum gracile =

Species of flowering plant

Nothoscordum gracile, also known as slender false garlic, or fragrant onion, is a bulbous plant belonging to the Amaryllidaceae family. Native from southern Mexico to western South America, the species is used as an ornamental plant due to its showy inflorescences and the fragrance of its flowers.

== Description ==
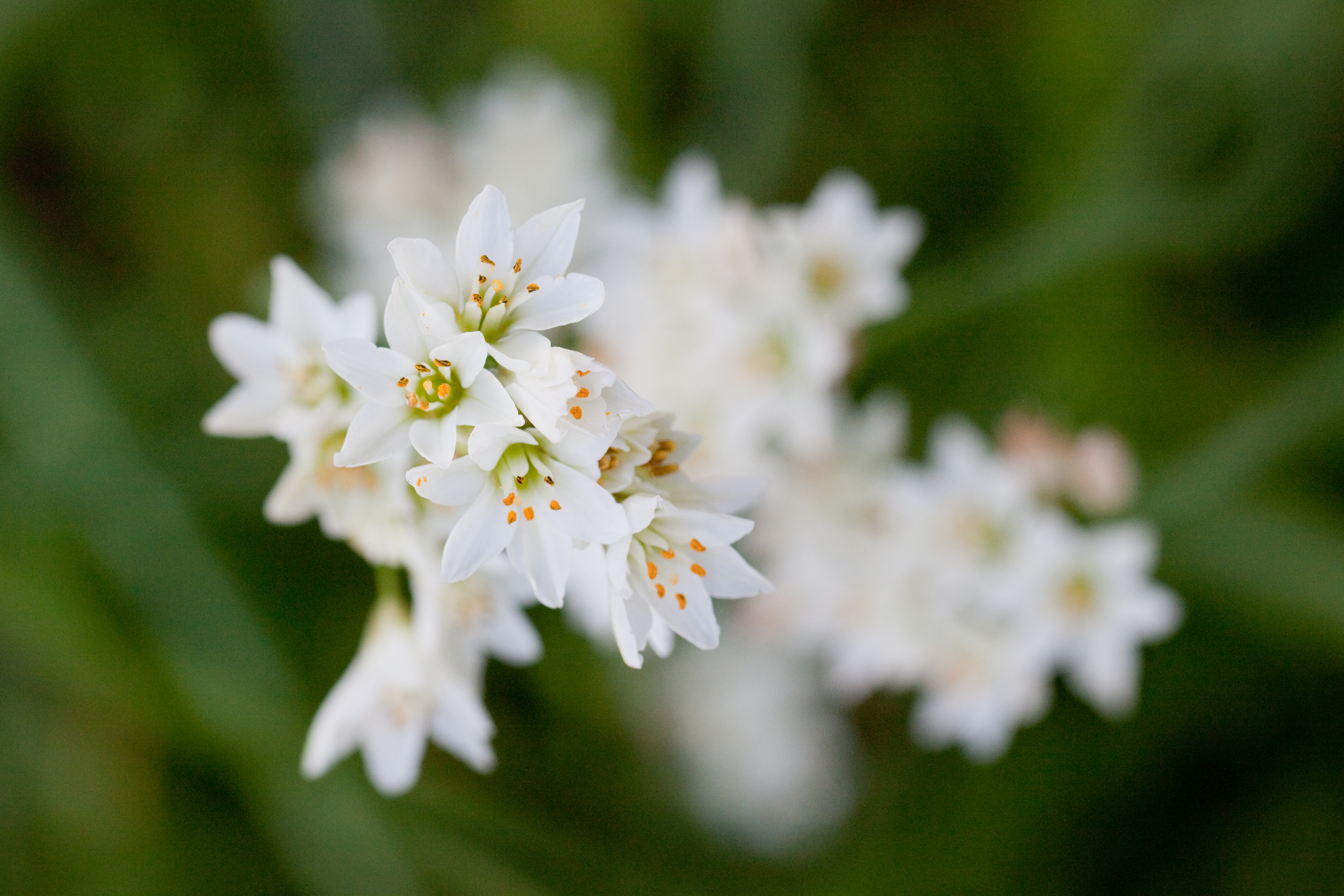
Flowers

Perennial, bulbous, deciduous herb that produces scapes that are cylindrical, green in colour and 20–60 cm tall. The strap-like leaves are simple, linear, with an entire margin and basal insertion.

The hermaphrodite flowers are bell-shaped, frequent, whitish in color, grouped in terminal umbels. Having a sweet lily-like scent, they bloom in from mid spring to early summer. The fruit is a loculicidal capsule, which becomes ripe by early summer.

== Uses ==
The bulb is about 15mm in diameter and is edible. The plant is a garlic substitute and can be used as a spice.

== Distribution ==
Its distribution range is from southeast Mexico to South America. It is widely naturalized in Australia, USA, South Asia, Southern Europe and Africa. A garden escape, it is a widespread, highly invasive and common weed in gardens that is hard to eradicate. It grows in grasslands, lawns, footpaths, pastures, roadsides and disperses through seed and underground bulblets. Its seeds can be dispersed by wind, water and dumped garden waste.
