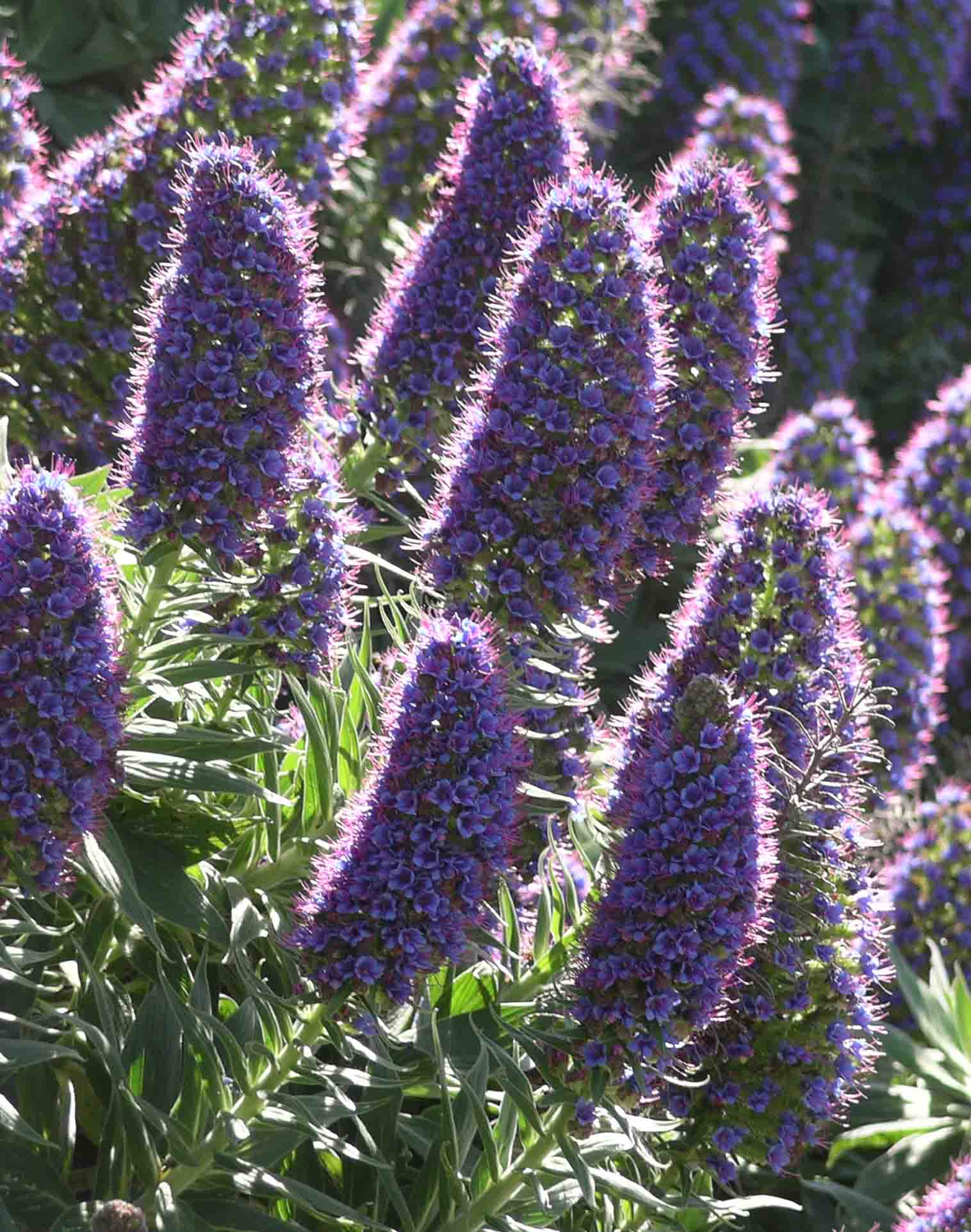

Conservation status
- Data Deficient (IUCN 3.1)

Scientific classification
- Kingdom: Plantae
- Clade: Embryophytes
- Clade: Tracheophytes
- Clade: Spermatophytes
- Clade: Angiosperms
- Clade: Eudicots
- Clade: Asterids
- Order: Boraginales
- Family: Boraginaceae
- Genus: Echium
- Species: E. candicans

Binomial name
- Echium candicans L.f., 1782

Synonyms
- Argyrexias candicans Raf. (1838); Echium brachyanthum Hornem. (1813); Echium candicans var. noronhae Menezes (1914); Echium cynoglossoides Desf. (1815); Echium densiflorum DC. (1813); Echium macrophyllum Lehm. (1818); Echium maderense Steud. (1840); Echium marianum Boiss. (1849); Echium pallidum Salisb. (1796); Echium pavonianum Boiss. (1849); Echium truncatum R.H.Pearson (1912)

= Echium candicans =

Pride of Madeira

Species of flowering plant

Echium candicans, the Pride of Madeira, is a species of flowering plant in the family Boraginaceae, and genus Echium, native to the island of Madeira. It is a large herbaceous perennial subshrub, growing to 1.5–2.5 m (4 ft 11 in – 8 ft 2 in).

In the first year after germination, the plant produces a broad rosette of leaves. In the second and subsequent years, more or less woody flowering stalks are produced clothed in rough leaves. The Latin specific epithet candicans means "shining white", referring to one colour form of this species.

== Description ==
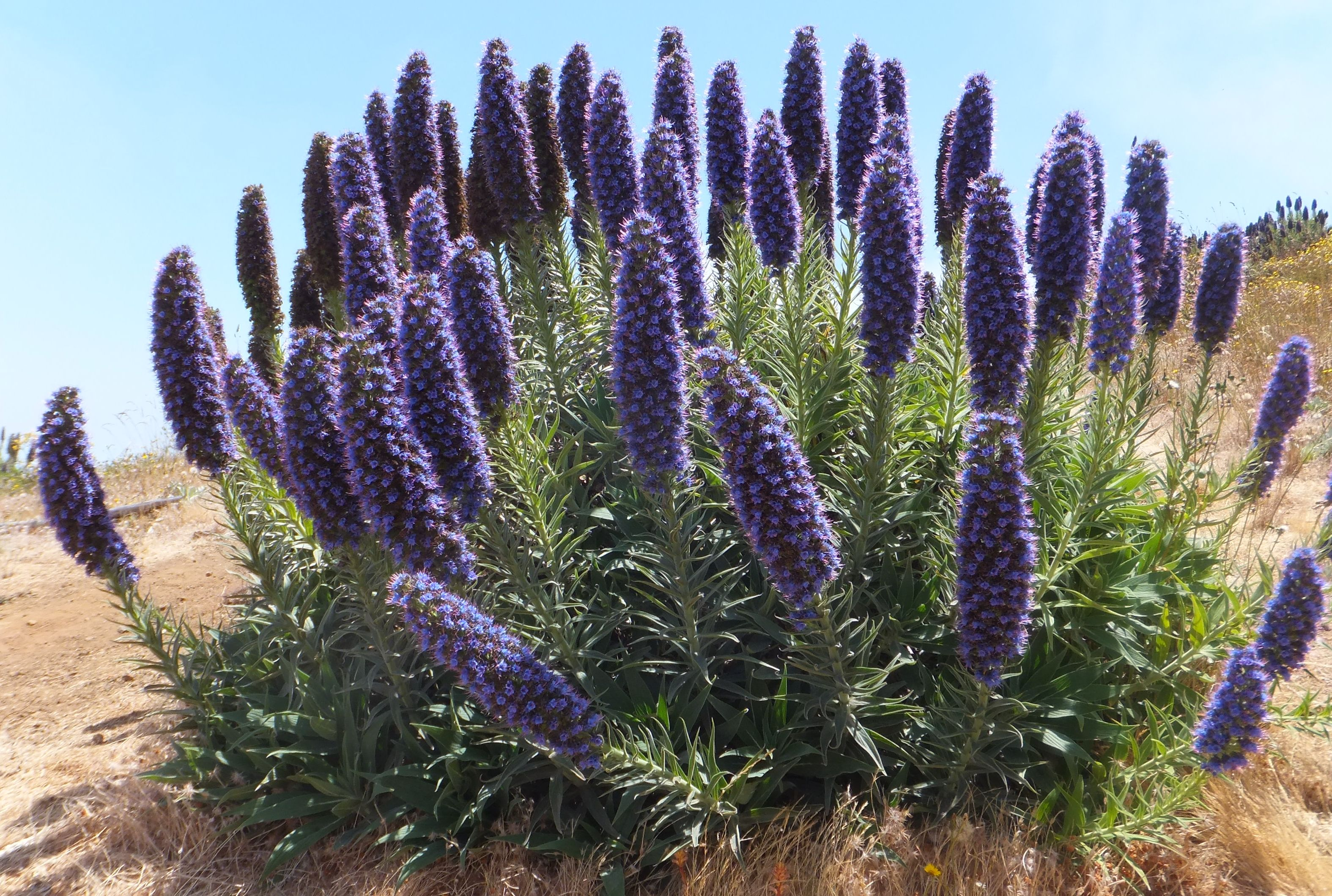
Growing as a shrub

It grows as a 1 to 2 meter high shrub, usually with a candelabra-like growth habit. The inflorescences are not on the terminal shoot, but terminally on side shoots. The bark is whitish and peels off the shoots like paper. The short-stalked leaves are lanceolate to ovate-lanceolate and long pointed at the end, they reach a maximum length of about 25 cm (9.8 in) and a width of 2 to 4 cm (0.8 to 1.6 in).

The lower leaves are more than five times as long as the upper ones. The adaxial side of the leaf blade (facing the shoot) is dark green, the axial side is slightly lighter green in color with prominent veins, all parts are protruding dense and soft, relatively long, velvety hairy.

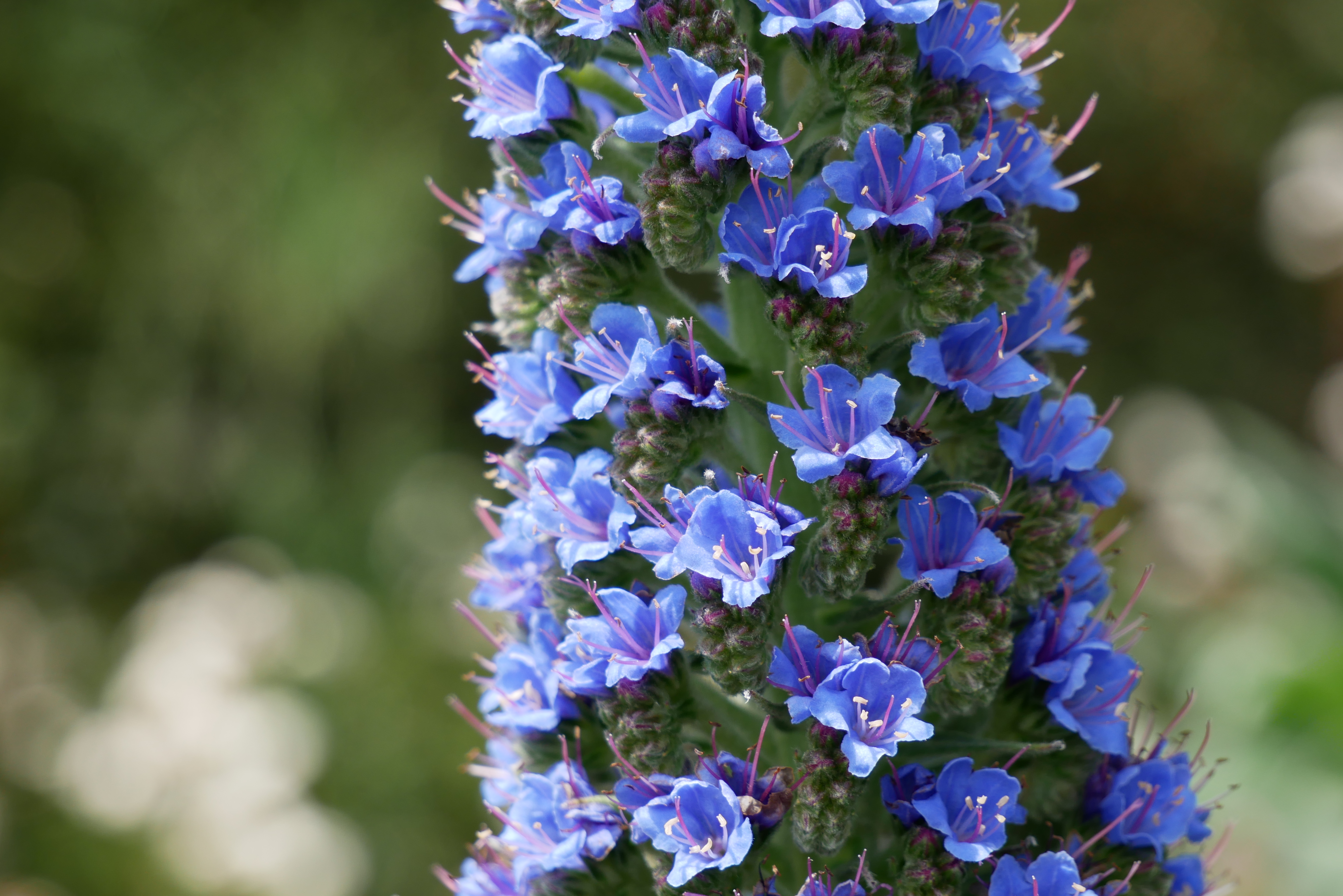
Flower detail

Many flowers and bracts are in a dense, narrow, elongated inflorescence, which reach 10 to 25 cm (3.9 to 9.8 in), maximum 47 cm (19 in) in length. The hermaphrodite, sessile flowers are fivefold with a double perianth and are weakly zygomorphic, unlike the flowers of most other genera in the Boraginaceae. They are colored blue or purple, and would appear from spring to summer.

The calyx is 4 to 5 millimeters long, green in color without darker veins and hairy, with lanceolate, pointed calyx lobes. The corolla is blue to violet, often with a white stripe on each apex, the flower tube is 9 to 11 millimeters long, the apex is rounded or truncated at the end. The stamens are pink, the anthers whitish. The flower head is large and covered with white or blue flowers having red stamens. The flower head is much visited by bees and butterflies for its nectar.

== Taxonomy ==
Echium candicans was given its scientific name by Carl Linnaeus the Younger in 1782. In 1792 Jean-Baptiste Lamarck published a nomen illegitimum name for the species Echium giganteum by giving it the same name as already given to E. candicans by Linnaeus. Since its first scientific description ten other species names and one variety have been published that are listed as synonyms by Plants of the World Online.

== Distribution ==
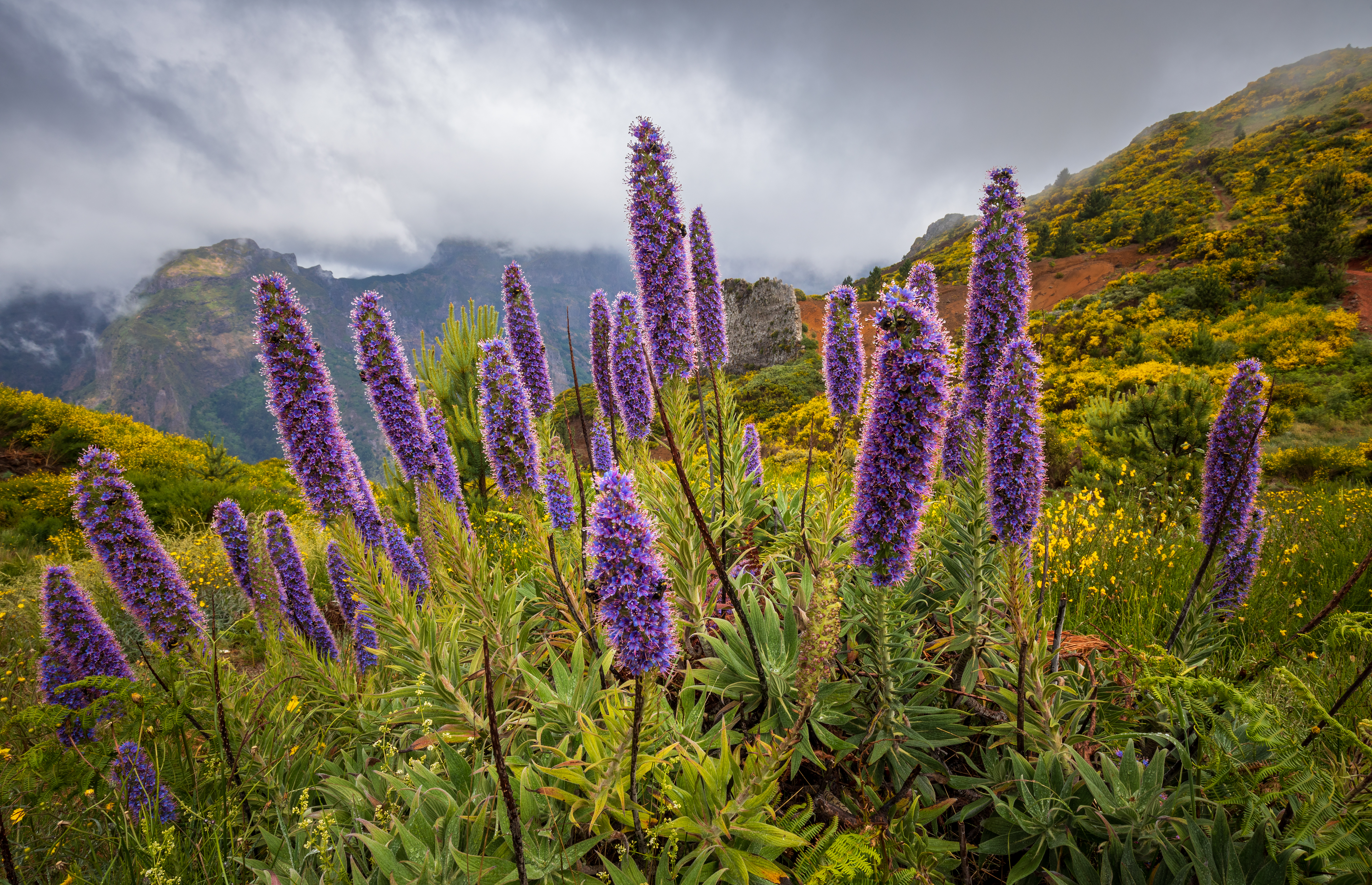
Echium candicans in Curral das Freiras, Câmara de Lobos, Madeira, Portugal

The species is autochthonous only to Madeira and is absent from the other islands in the archipelago. It grows relatively frequently there at an altitude of about 800 to 1,200 meters (2,600 to 3,900 ft) in the central part of the island, at the upper end of the altitude range of the laurel forest and in open, heather-like vegetation.

== Cultivation ==
E. candicans is cultivated in the horticulture trade and widely available throughout the world as an ornamental plant for traditional and drought-tolerant, water-conserving gardens. It is particularly suitable for coastal planting. With a temperature requirement of no less than 5–7 °C (41–45 °F), it needs some winter protection in frost-prone areas. It has gained the Royal Horticultural Society's Award of Garden Merit.

In California, it is considered an invasive species. It is removed from native plant communities as part of habitat restoration efforts in coastal parks such as the Golden Gate National Recreation Area. In New Zealand, it is a common garden escapee onto roadside verges and shingle banks throughout the drier parts of both the North and the South Islands. In the state of Victoria, Australia, it is considered to be a high weed risk and an alert has been posted by the Department of Primary Industries.
