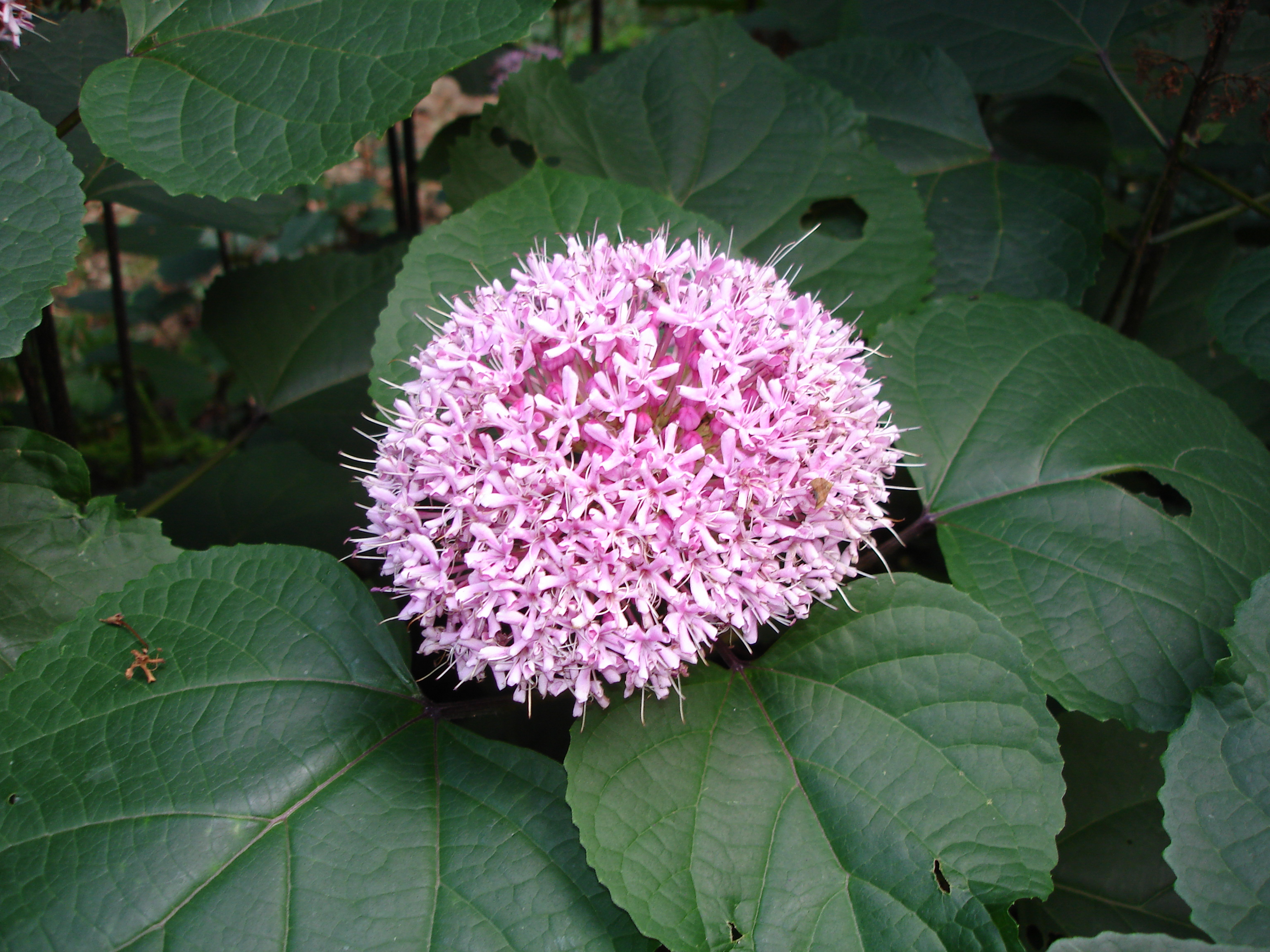

Scientific classification
- Kingdom: Plantae
- Clade: Tracheophytes
- Clade: Angiosperms
- Clade: Eudicots
- Clade: Asterids
- Order: Lamiales
- Family: Lamiaceae
- Genus: Clerodendrum
- Species: C. bungei

Binomial name
- Clerodendrum bungei Steud.

Synonyms
- Volkameria bungei (Steud.); Clerodendrum fragrans var. foetidum (Bakh.)

= Clerodendrum bungei =

Species of flowering plant

Clerodendrum bungei, commonly known as rose glory bower, glory flower or Mexican hydrangea (though neither a Hydrangea nor from Mexico), is a species of flowering plant in the deadnettle family, Lamiaceae. Native to China, it is commonly grown in gardens as an ornamental shrub. It has escaped from cultivation and is naturalized in the Americas.

== Description ==
Clerodendrum bungei is a deciduous shrub that grows up to 2 m in height. Its leaves are cordate (heart-shaped), 10–20 cm long and not quite as wide, and have coarsely toothed edges. The flowers, which appear in late summer, are coloured rose, crimson, or pink, and arranged in a conspicuous rounded terminal inflorescence known as corymb, which is up to 10 cm in diameter. As in other Clerodendrum species, the calyx is five-lobed. At the centre of each flower there is a slender tube c. 3–4 cm long which terminates in five spreading white lobes. While the flowers are fragrant, crushed leaves have an unpleasant odour.

Clerodendrum bungei possess extrafloral nectaries that produce a sweet secretion attracting ants (and other arthropods), which in return often protect plant from herbivory.

== Taxonomy ==
Clerodendrum bungei was discovered in 1831 by Russian botanist Alexander von Bunge in Beijing during his long scientific expedition in East Asia. Two years later, he described it as C. foetidum on the account of the pungent smell of its leaves. Since that name had already been occupied by another species, German botanist Ernst Gottlieb von Steudel renamed it C. bungei in 1840. The genus name is composed of Greek words meaning "chance" and "tree" while the specific epithet honours Alexander von Bunge.

== Distribution and habitat ==
Clerodendrum bungei is native to Taiwan, Vietnam, and all the mainland provinces and autonomous regions of China except Jilin and Liaoning. It grows along roadsides and in mixed forests on mountain slopes below 2500 m.

== Cultivation ==
Clerodendrum bungei was first introduced into Europe c. 1850 by Scottish plant collector Robert Fortune. At Kew Gardens in England it was treated as a greenhouse plant until another nursery proved its winter hardiness. As in nature, cultivated plants grow to the height of 2 m. In the British Isles it is frequently killed to the ground by frost, only to send up "vigorous, erect, woody shoots" the next summer. In colder areas, such as the U.S. state of Missouri, it is grown in containers and overwintered in sunny rooms or conservatories. Its flowers attract butterflies.

Clerodendrum bungei is noted for its suckering habit and rapid growth which allow it to form spreading colonies. It is valued for its flowers but its aggressive spread makes it suited best for somewhat isolated areas. C. bungei has escaped from gardens in North America and naturalized from Texas to Georgia and Florida.

== See also ==
- List of Lamiaceae of South Africa
