= Hederifolium =

Hederifolium is Latin for "ivy-leaved", and is the species name of two plants:

- Cyclamen hederifolium, a widespread and commonly cultivated perennial
- Pelargonium peltatum, illegitimately named Pelargonium hederifolium
