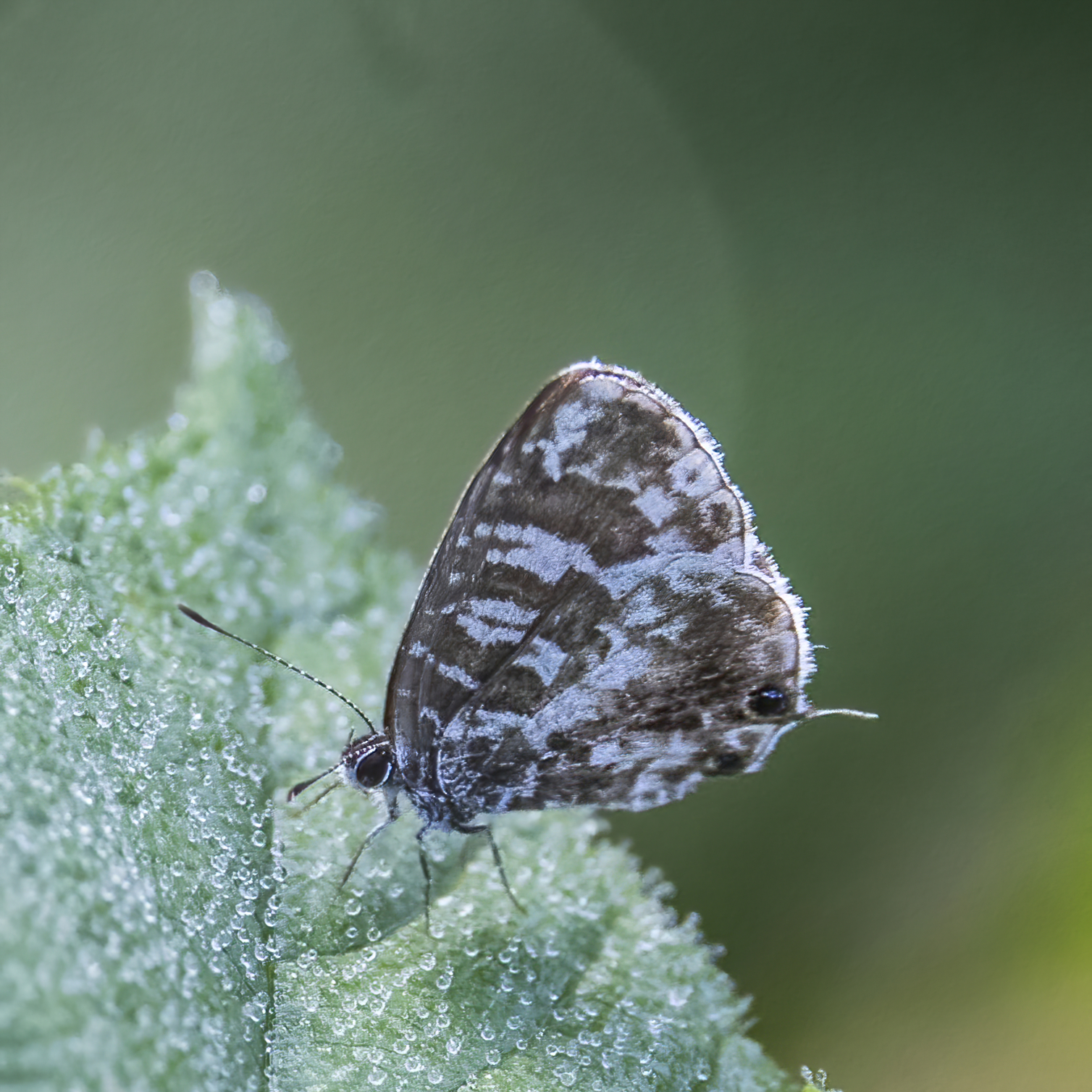
- in Ghana

Scientific classification
- Kingdom: Animalia
- Phylum: Arthropoda
- Clade: Pancrustacea
- Class: Insecta
- Order: Lepidoptera
- Family: Lycaenidae
- Genus: Cacyreus
- Species: C. audeoudi

Binomial name
- Cacyreus audeoudi Stempffer, 1936

= Cacyreus audeoudi =

Species of butterfly

Cacyreus audeoudi, the Audeoud's blue or bright bush blue, is a butterfly in the family Lycaenidae. It is found in Guinea, Sierra Leone, Liberia, Ivory Coast, Ghana, Nigeria (south and the Cross River loop), Cameroon, the Republic of the Congo, the Democratic Republic of the Congo (Mongala, Uele, Ituri, Kivu, Tshopo, Equateur, Sankuru and Lualaba), Uganda, western Kenya, western Tanzania. The habitat consists of forests and forest-savanna areas.

Torben Larsen developed a species numbering system for his 2005 publication Butterflies of West Africa. This species is #577. The 'Larsen' numbers have since been used with permission in A Sharp Eye on Butterflies of Ghana.
