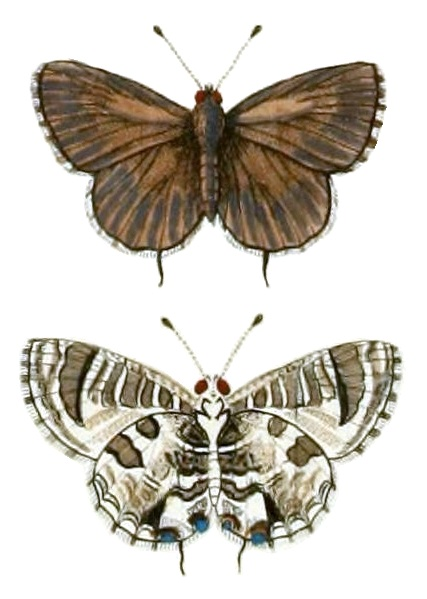
- Cacyreus lingeus, male

Scientific classification
- Kingdom: Animalia
- Phylum: Arthropoda
- Clade: Pancrustacea
- Class: Insecta
- Order: Lepidoptera
- Family: Lycaenidae
- Subfamily: Polyommatinae
- Tribe: Polyommatini
- Genus: Cacyreus; Butler, [1898]

Synonyms
- Hyreus Hübner, [1819]

= Cacyreus =

Butterfly genus in family Lycaenidae

Cacyreus is an Afrotropical genus of butterflies in the family Lycaenidae.

== Species ==
- Cacyreus audeoudi Stempffer, 1936
- Cacyreus darius (Mabille, 1877)
- Cacyreus dicksoni Pennington, 1962
- Cacyreus ethiopicus Tite, 1961
- Cacyreus lingeus (Stoll, [1782])
- Cacyreus niebuhri Larsen, 1982
- Cacyreus marshalli Butler, 1897
- Cacyreus tespis (Herbst, 1804)
- Cacyreus virilis Stempffer, 1936
