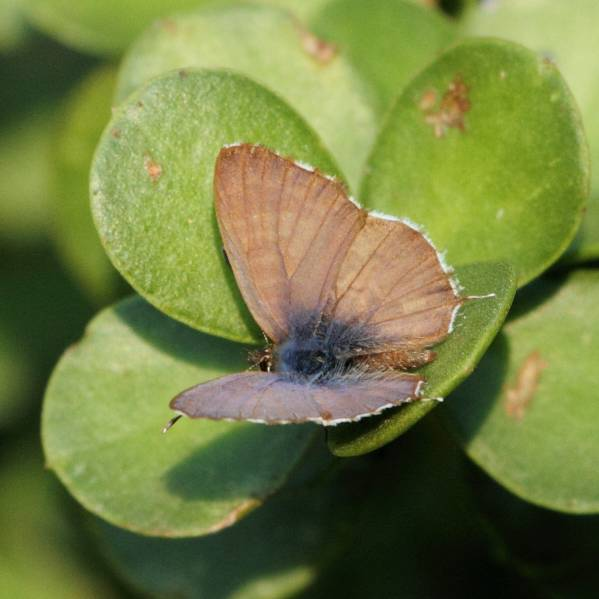
- male

Scientific classification
- Kingdom: Animalia
- Phylum: Arthropoda
- Clade: Pancrustacea
- Class: Insecta
- Order: Lepidoptera
- Family: Lycaenidae
- Genus: Cacyreus
- Species: C. lingeus

Binomial name
- Cacyreus lingeus (Stoll, [1782])

Synonyms
- Papilio lingeus Stoll, [1782]; Papilio ericus Fabricius, 1793; Cupido lingeus var. ciliaris Aurivillius, 1910

= Cacyreus lingeus =

Bush bronze

Species of butterfly

Cacyreus lingeus, the common bush blue or bush bronze, is a butterfly of the family Lycaenidae.

== Range ==
It is a common species in much of sub-Saharan Africa, though mostly at lower altitudes.

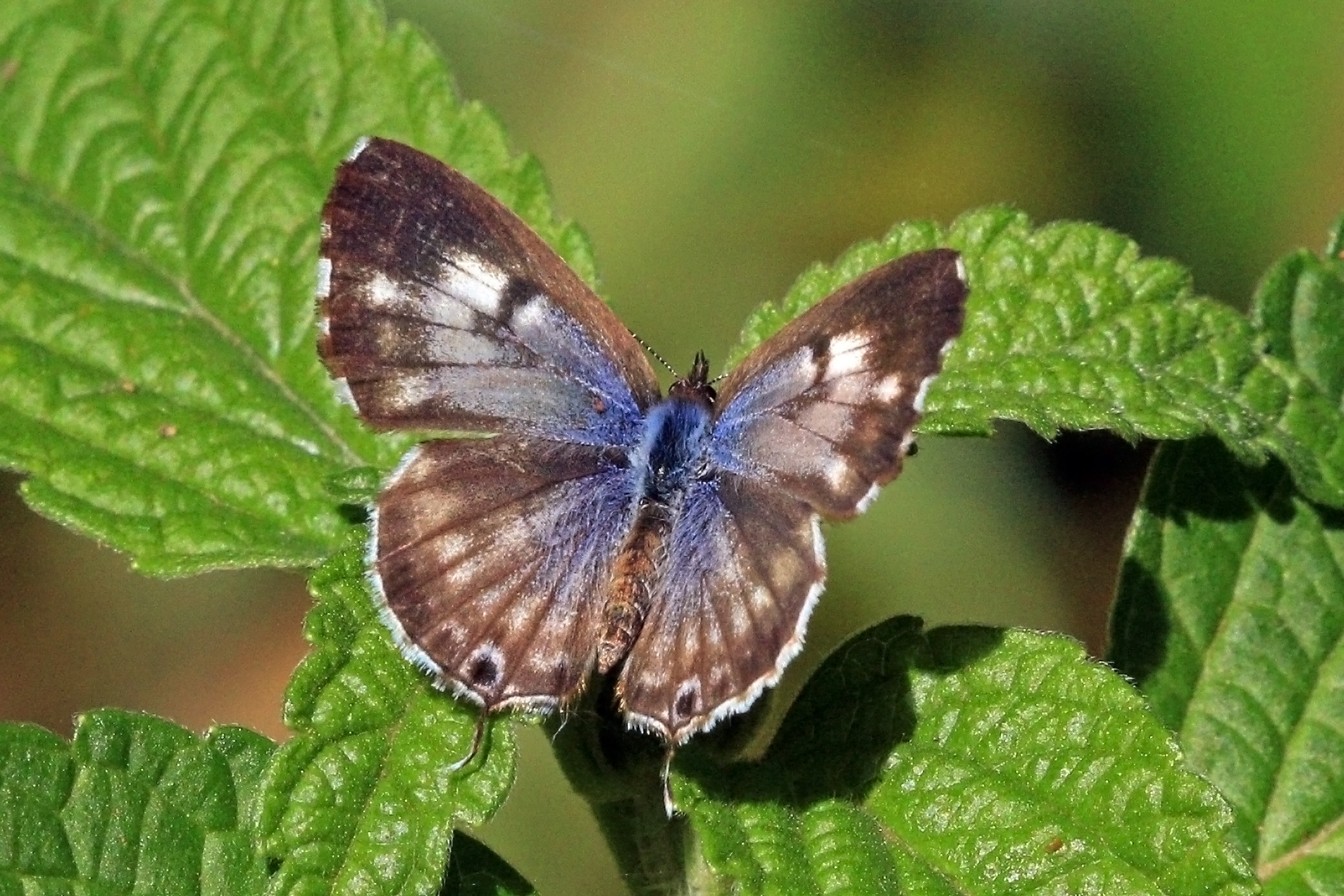
female, Kenya

underside, Tanzania

== Description ==
The wingspan is 22–27 mm for males and 22–28 mm for females. The larvae are pale green.

Torben Larsen developed a species numbering system for his 2005 publication Butterflies of West Africa. This species is #575. The 'Larsen' numbers have since been used with permission in A Sharp Eye on Butterflies of Ghana.

== Habits ==
Adults are on wing year-round, with a peak from October to February. In exceptional situations adults may be on the wing in winter months in cooler areas.

== Foodplants ==
The larvae may feed on the flowers, the leaves or inside the stems of their foodplants. Various Lamiaceae species are utilized, including Plectranthus, Salvia, Calamintha, Lavandula, Mentha and Hemizygia species.
