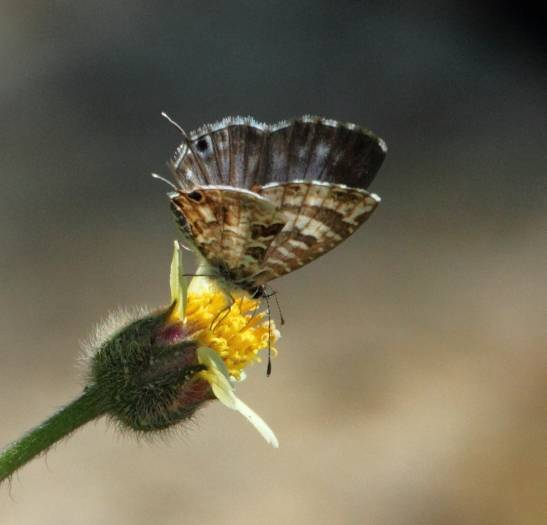

Scientific classification
- Domain: Eukaryota
- Kingdom: Animalia
- Phylum: Arthropoda
- Class: Insecta
- Order: Lepidoptera
- Family: Lycaenidae
- Genus: Cacyreus
- Species: C. virilis

Binomial name
- Cacyreus virilis Stempffer, 1936

Synonyms
- Cupido lingeus ab. virilis Aurivillius, 1925

= Cacyreus virilis =

Species of butterfly

Cacyreus virilis, the eastern bush blue, mocker bronze or mocker blue, is a butterfly of the family Lycaenidae. It is found from South Africa to Zimbabwe, through central and eastern Africa to south-western Arabia.

The wingspan is 24–26 mm for males and 24–27 mm for females. Adults are on wing year-round, with a peak from November to February.

The larvae feed on the flowers of various Lamiaceae species, including Coleus, Salvia, Calamintha and Lavandula species.
