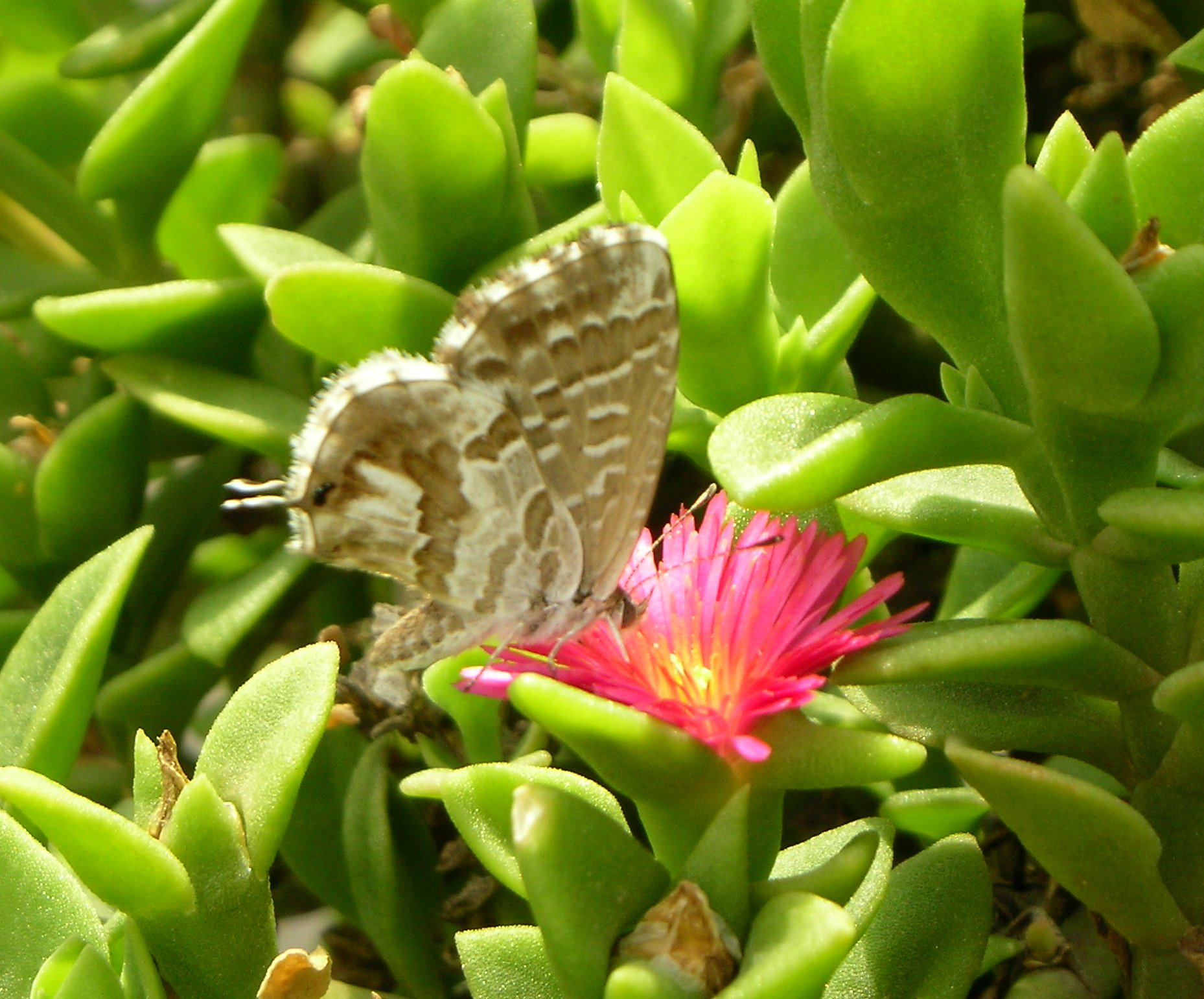

Scientific classification
- Kingdom: Animalia
- Phylum: Arthropoda
- Class: Insecta
- Order: Lepidoptera
- Family: Lycaenidae
- Genus: Cacyreus
- Species: C. marshalli

Binomial name
- Cacyreus marshalli Butler, 1897

= Geranium bronze =

Species of butterfly

The geranium bronze or brun des pélargoniums in French (Cacyreus marshalli), is a butterfly in the family Lycaenidae.

The geranium bronze butterfly is native to South Africa. The butterfly was first introduced to Europe in the late 20th century, where it has quickly spread to many southern and eastern European regions. Since its introduction to Europe, the geranium bronze butterfly has become a pest to cultivated Pelargonium and Geranium plant species. Currently, efforts are being made to contain the spread of the geranium bronze butterflies as well as to determine the most effective pesticide for the species.

== Description ==
The adult geranium bronze butterfly's wingspan ranges from 15–23 mm in males and 18–23 mm in females. The wings are brown/bronze with a white border outlining the wings. The underside is a grey-brown with darker bands interlaced with white, creating an intricate pattern. The hindwings contain an eye spot in order to divert predators from attacking. The male and female are similar in appearance.

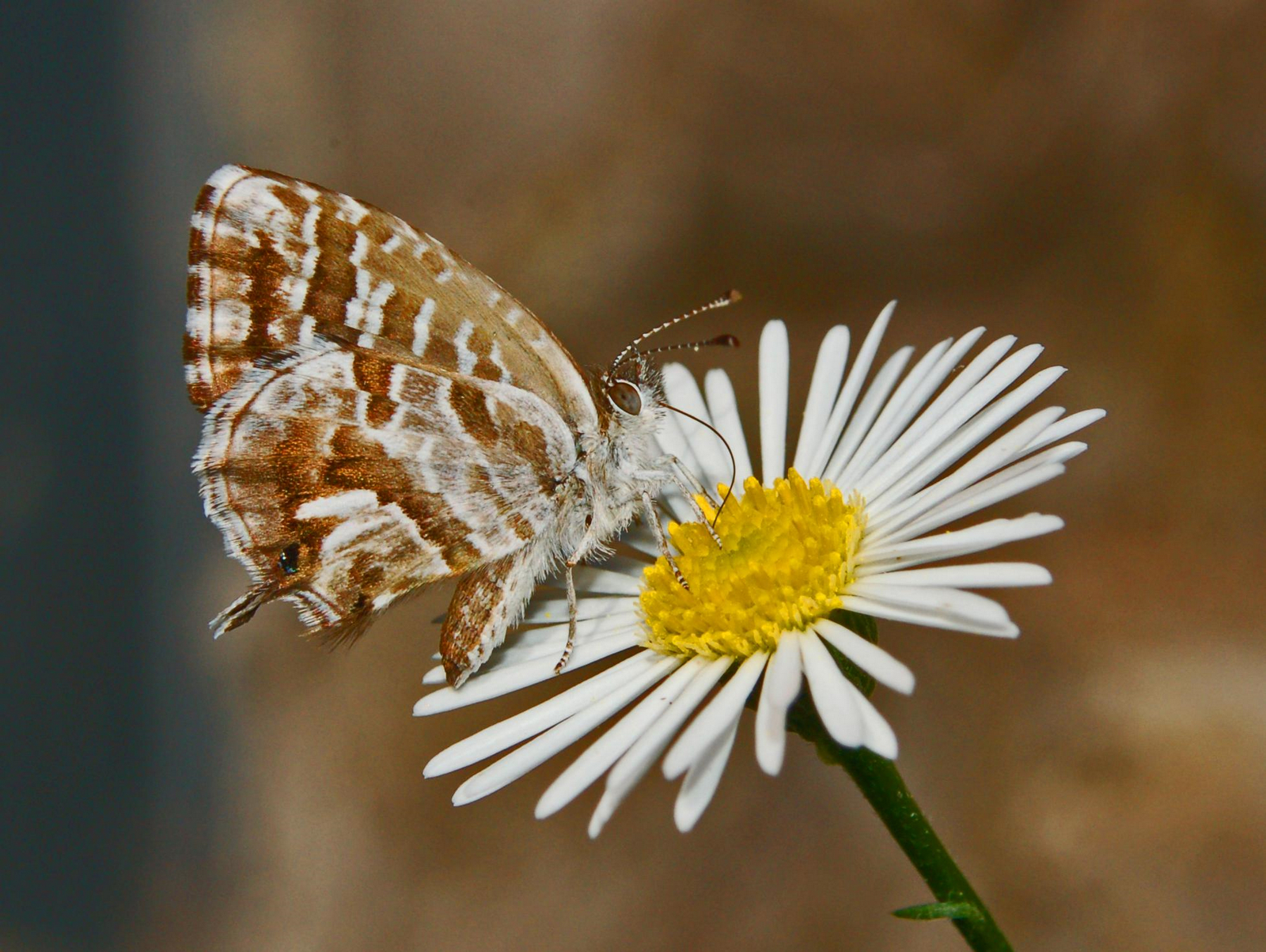
Imago, underside

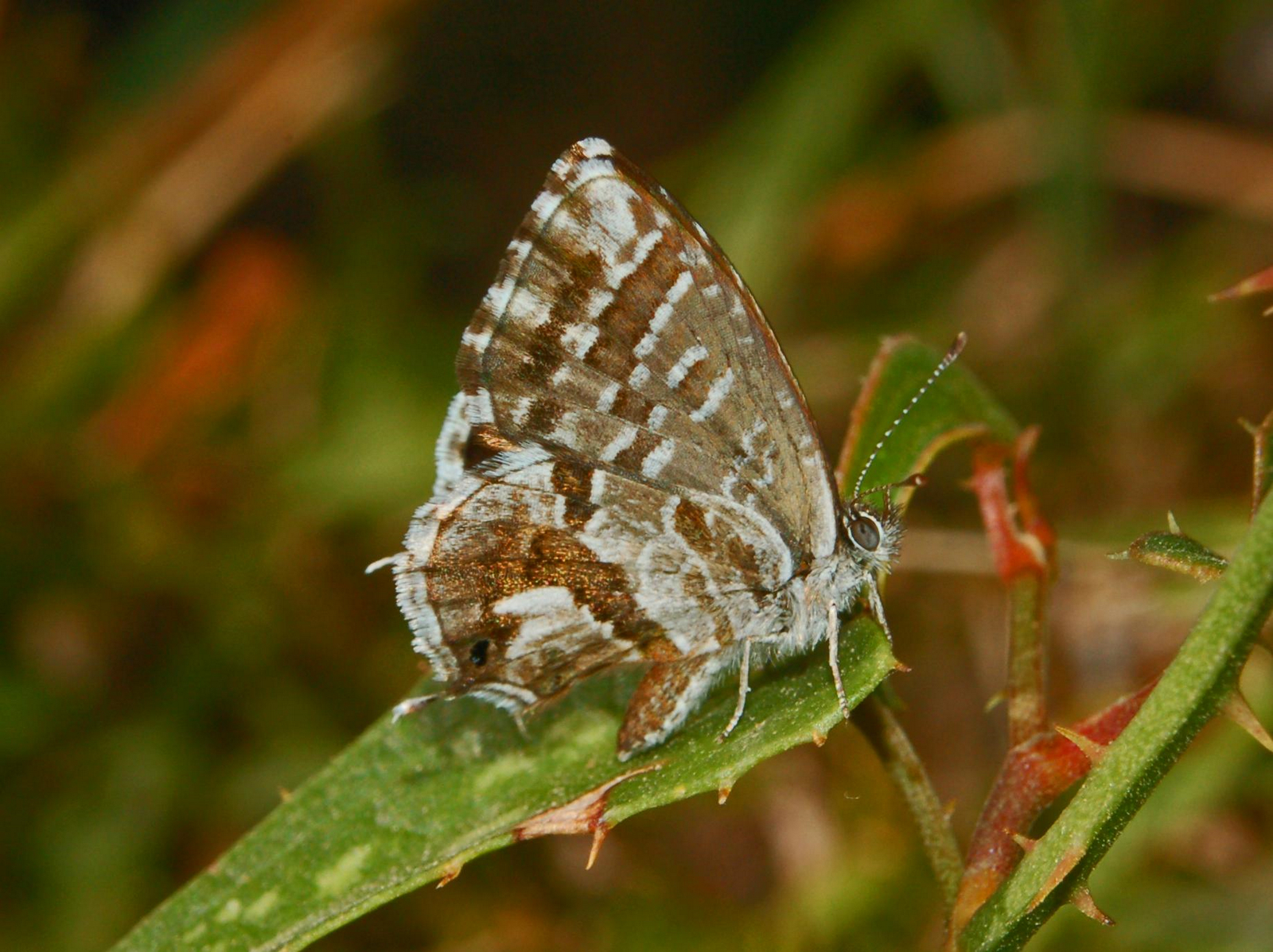
Imago, underside

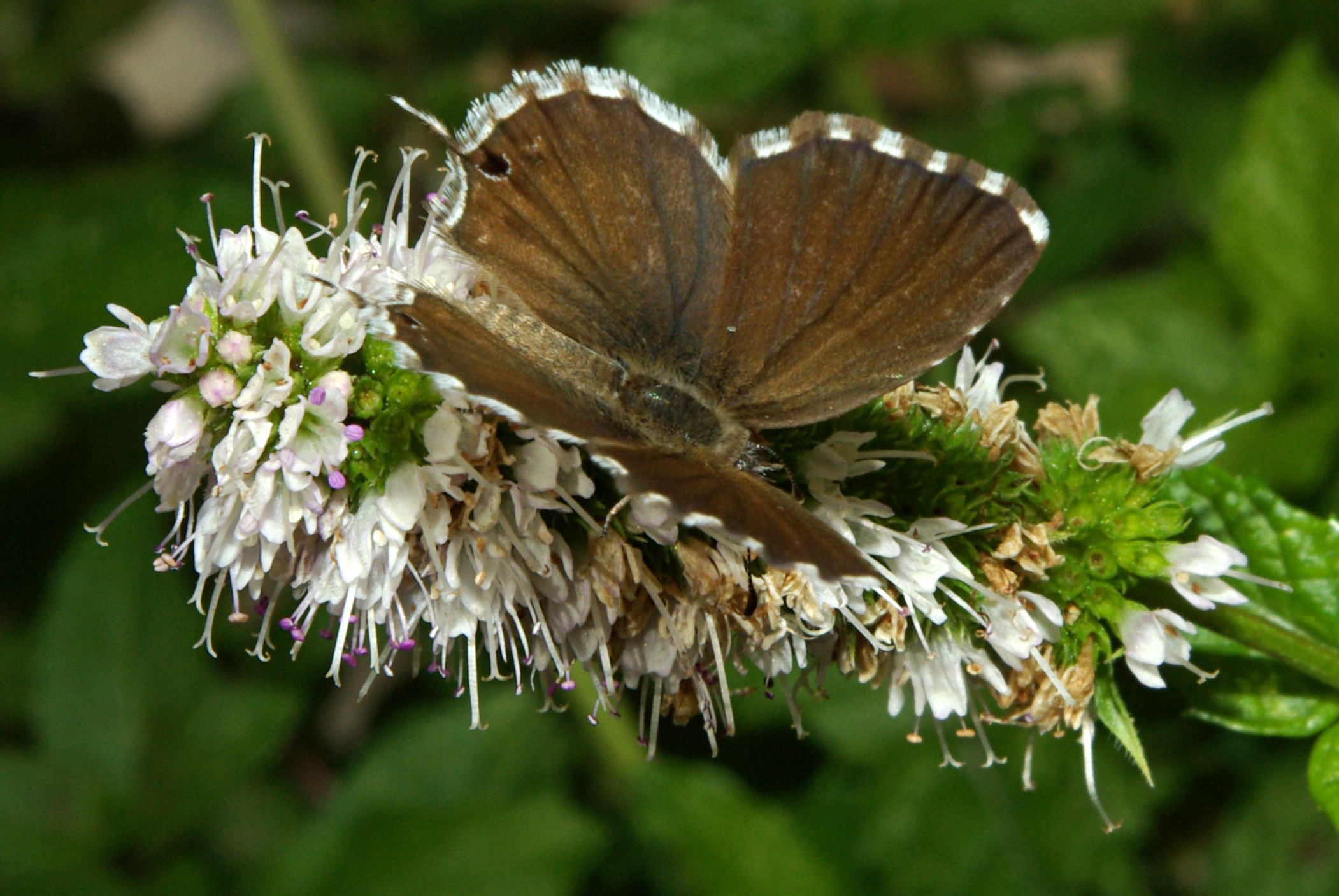
Imago, upperside

== Geographic range ==
The geranium bronze was first recorded in regions of South Africa, including KwaZulu-Natal and the Cape Provinces, as well as in neighbouring countries such as Eswatini, Botswana, Zimbabwe, Lesotho, and Mozambique. It was accidentally brought to Europe in 1978. After being recorded in England, a colony of geranium bronze was soon found in Mallorca in 1990, and has since spread to most of the regions in southern Europe. In 1996, the geranium bronze butterfly was first recorded in Rome, Italy, and rapidly spread along the Adriatic and Tyrrhenian coastal areas before extending inland. The geranium bronze butterfly now has established colonies in Belgium, Germany, the Netherlands, Italy, France, Greece, Malta, Spain, Portugal, southern Switzerland, Slovenia, Croatia, and the French Mediterranean. The first record of the species in Palestine was made in the garden of the Palestine Museum of Natural History.

== Food resources ==
=== Caterpillars ===
After hatching, the geranium bronze larvae feed on the flower buds, young leaves, and soft stems of their host plant, typically from the genera Pelargonium and Geranium. In order to eat the stem of these plants, the larvae drill into the stems, causing damage to the plants.

== Life history ==
=== Egg ===
Geranium bronze eggs are small with a slight green color that turns white then brown or light-yellow before the larva hatches. The eggs are 0.5 mm in diameter and 0.3 mm in height. The eggs are typically laid close to the flower buds, but are occasionally laid on the leaves. The laying of eggs usually occurs during summer months, while caterpillar activity has been recorded in the summer, fall, and winter.

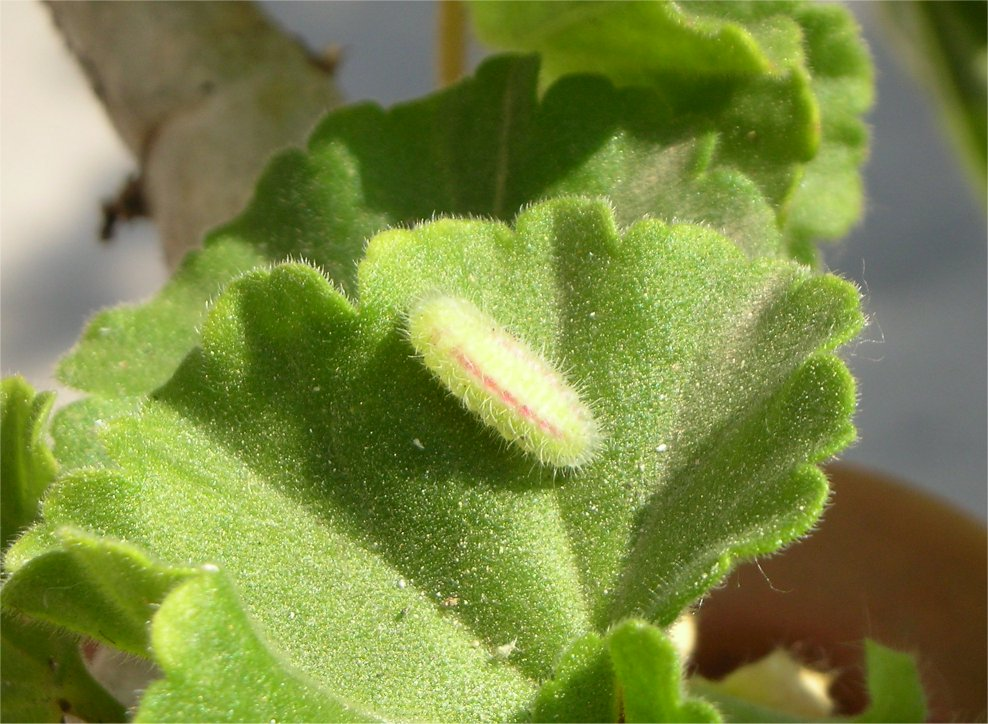
Geranium bronze larva

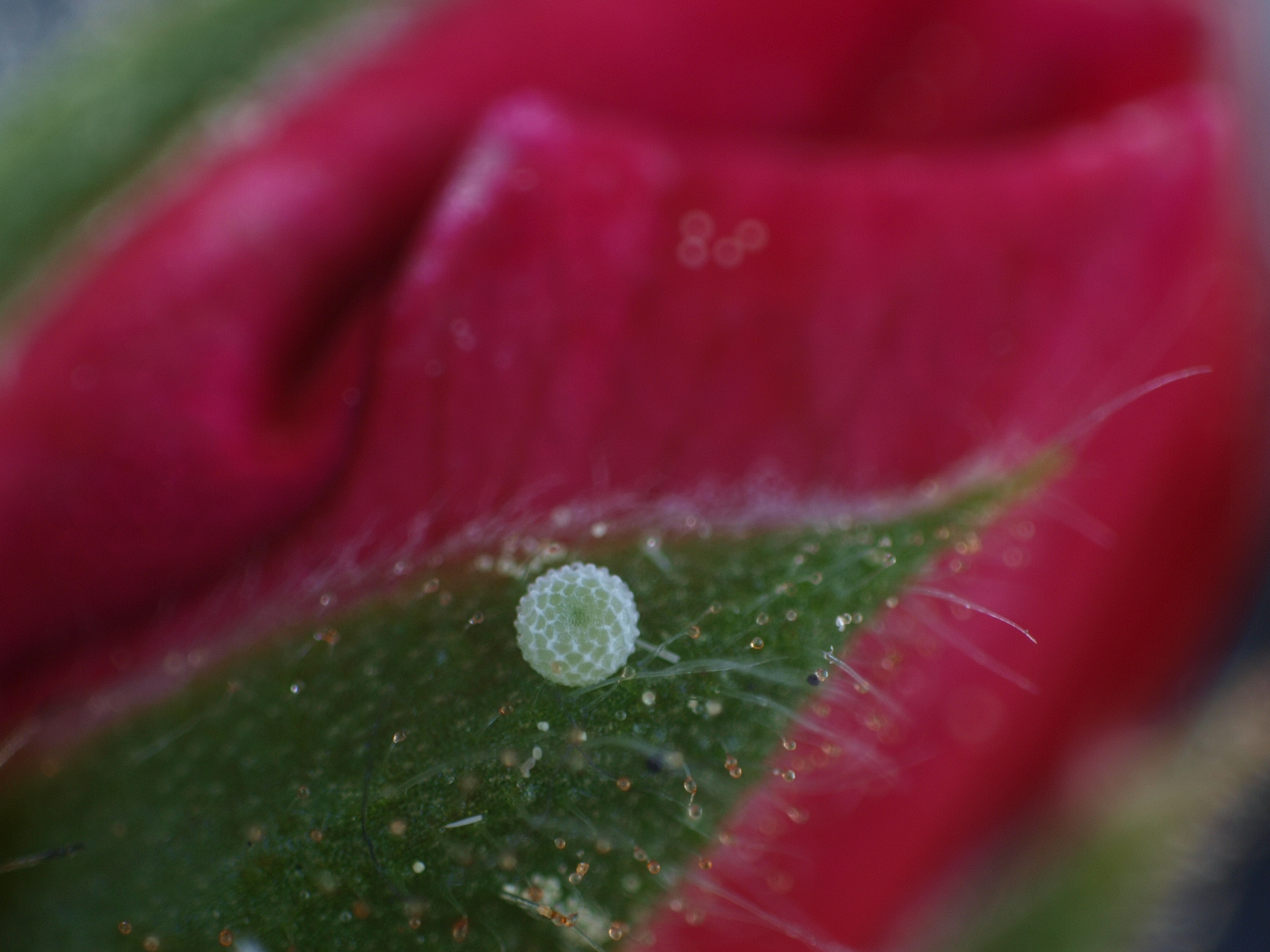
Cacyreus marshalli egg

=== Caterpillar ===
Once hatched, the larvae bore through the stem of the host plant, where they are typically found within the stem or flower buds. The plant stem usually turns black after being invaded by larvae. The larva feeds on the host plant, damaging the host until it enters the pupa stage.

During the first instar stage, the caterpillar's average length is 1 mm, which will increase to 2 mm during the following 8 days. Second instar caterpillars grow to an average of 3 mm; third instars to 6 mm; and fourth instars grow to 13 mm. The second, third, and fourth instar stages occur for a duration of 8, 8, and 9 days, respectively. The color of the caterpillars can vary. Most caterpillars are yellow or green, and may have pink markings.

=== Pupa ===
The pupa stage occurs at the bottom of the flower peduncle in many of the host species. The peduncles offer the best protection for the caterpillars, which is why the caterpillars will typically remain at the base of the flower until metamorphosis occurs. It has been suggested that geranium bronze may overwinter as either a caterpillar or a pupa, although further data is needed to confirm this.

The pupa color varies, but they are typically green, pale-yellow, or brown. The pupa are hairy and are typically 9 mm long.

== Migration ==
Adults are on wing year-round in warmer areas, but usually from August to May in South Africa. At higher altitudes, adults are on wing in December and January.

Geranium bronze have spread from their native regions of South Africa to numerous southern and eastern European regions. This was likely due to accidental transportation of plants infested with geranium bronze larvae and not due to any natural migration patterns. The geranium bronze butterflies fly for short periods of time and frequently rest.

== Predators ==
The geranium bronze butterfly has not been reported as a pest in its native home and surrounding South African regions. It is believed that the butterfly has not become a pest in the South African regions because of an indigenous predator or parasitoid that has kept the butterfly population low. The predator has yet to be identified.

== Parental care ==
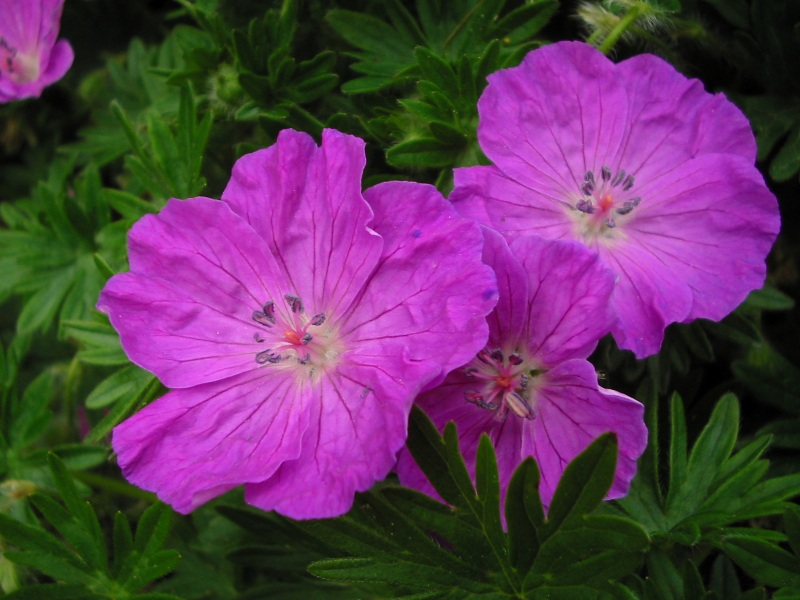
Geranium sanguineum, one of geranium bronze's preferred host plants

=== Oviposition ===
Geranium bronze females prefer to lay their eggs on the flower buds of various Geranium species. They typically oviposit on top of and underneath leaves, but infrequently on stems. Geranium bronze butterflies are multivoltine, meaning they lay two or more broods per year.

=== Plant selection for egg laying ===
Geranium bronze typically lay eggs on plants from genera Pelargonium and Geranium, both in the family Geraniaceae. Once hatched, these plants act as hosts to the larvae. Quacchia et al. (2008) found that geranium bronze butterflies in Italy displayed preference for egg laying on Geranium sanguineum, Geranium sylvaticum, and Geranium pratense Data was collected from a 2-year observation in various regions of Piedmont and the Aosta Valley, Italy. Plant preference and offspring fitness (using wingspan as a marker for fitness) were analyzed, but no statistically significant correlation was found.

== Interaction with humans ==
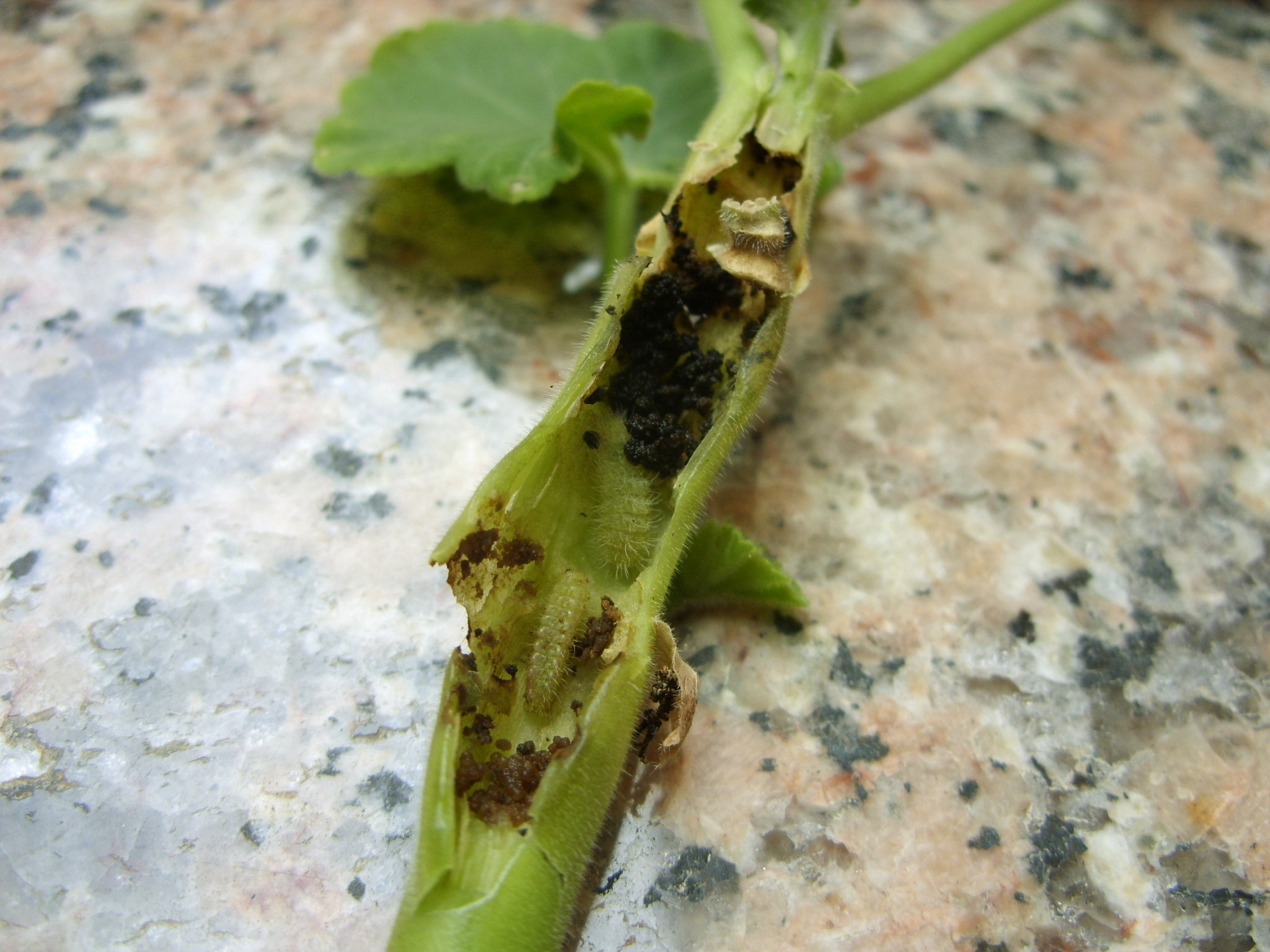
Geranium bronze damage to Geranium plant

=== Pest of plants ===
Geranium bronze butterflies pose a large threat to Pelargonium species in Europe. European and Mediterranean Plant Protection Organization currently lists geranium bronze as an A2 quarantine pest for Europe, and an A1 quarantine pest for Turkey. If geranium bronze numbers in Italy and other regions of Europe continue to rise, it is possible that they will become a larger threat for not only the native flora, but also for local biodiversity. Geranium bronze may start to be in competition with indigenous lycaenid species whose only food source is Geranium plants, such as E. eumedon and A. nicias.

Unfortunately, as pests, the geranium bronze butterflies have caused economic troubles as well. In countries like Spain, the Geranium plant species are highly valued in Spanish homes as ornaments. According to Sarto i Monteys et al., these plants are highly important in both sales and in employment for both production and marketing (Sarto i Monteys V 1991). In Spain alone, there are four major Geranium plant companies, together collecting over $30 million a year in the market. Companies have already seen drops in sales as the Geraniums have been affected by these butterflies. Currently, research is being done to find effective ways to prevent the attacks by these butterflies, but unfortunately many possible insecticides are too chemically potent on the plants that control of these butterflies has been difficult.

=== Use of pesticides on geranium bronze ===
There is a large body of research on the use of pesticides on geranium bronze butterflies. Contact pesticides were found to have no effect on the butterfly, because the larva spends the majority of its life within the plant, along with other endophytic habits. Herrero et al. found that B. thuringiensis may be effective in controlling the geranium bronze . In addition to Bacillus thuringiensis, the insecticides diflubenzuron, flufenoxuron, hexaflumuron, lambda-cyhalothrin, alphamethrin and benfuracarb are also effective.
