= Cacyreus ethiopicus =

Scientific classification
- Kingdom: Animalia
- Phylum: Arthropoda
- Class: Insecta
- Order: Lepidoptera
- Family: Lycaenidae
- Genus: Cacyreus
- Species: C. ethiopicus

Binomial name
- Cacyreus ethiopicus Tite, 1961

Species of butterfly

Cacyreus ethiopicus is a butterfly in the family Lycaenidae. It is found in Ethiopia.
