= Petal =

Part of most types of flower

In a mature flower, the perianth consists of a calyx (sepals) and the corolla (petals) it supports.

Petals are modified leaves that form an inner whorl surrounding the reproductive parts of flowers. They are often brightly coloured or unusually shaped to attract pollinators. All of the petals of a flower are collectively known as the corolla.

Petals are usually surrounded by an outer whorl of modified leaves called sepals, that collectively form the calyx. When the petals and sepals of a flower are difficult to distinguish, they are collectively called tepals.

Although petals are usually the most conspicuous parts of flowers pollinated by animals, wind-pollinated species such as the grasses often have very small petals or none at all.

== Corolla ==
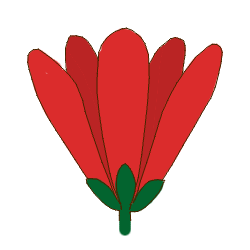
Apopetalous corolla

The collection of all petals in a flower is referred to as the corolla. The role of the corolla in plant evolution has been studied extensively since Charles Darwin postulated a theory of the origin of elongated corollae and corolla tubes.

A corolla of separate petals, without fusion of individual segments, is apopetalous. If the petals are free from one another in the corolla, the plant is polypetalous or choripetalous; while if the petals are at least partially fused, it is gamopetalous or sympetalous. In the case of fused tepals, the term is syntepalous. Fused petals may form a tube, which is then known as a 'corolla tube'.

== Petals, sepals, and tepals ==
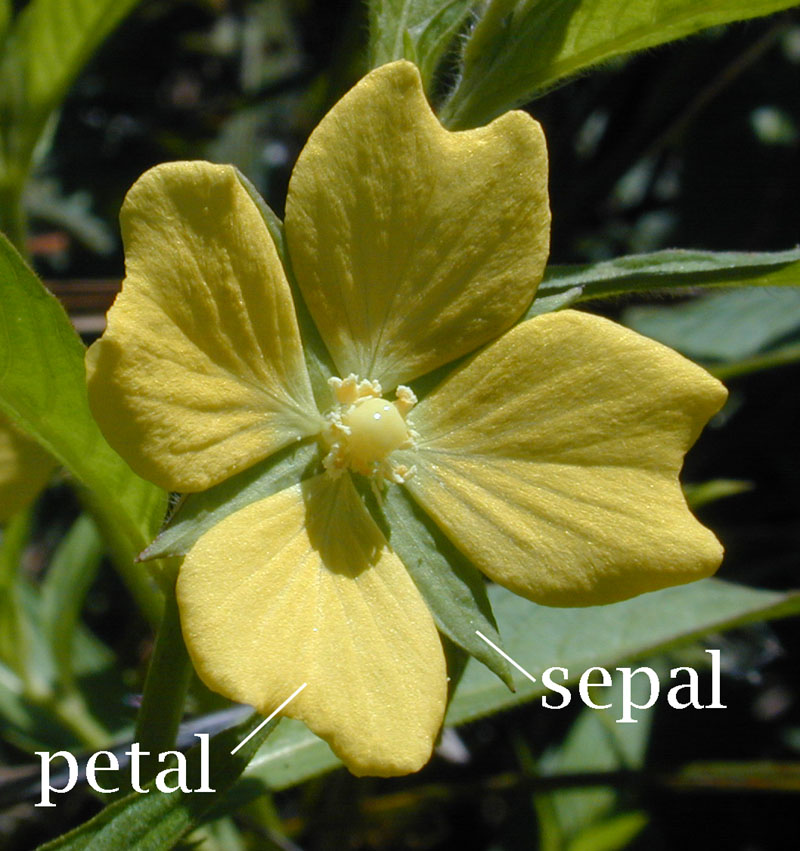
Tetrameric flower of a primrose willowherb (Ludwigia octovalvis) showing petals and sepals

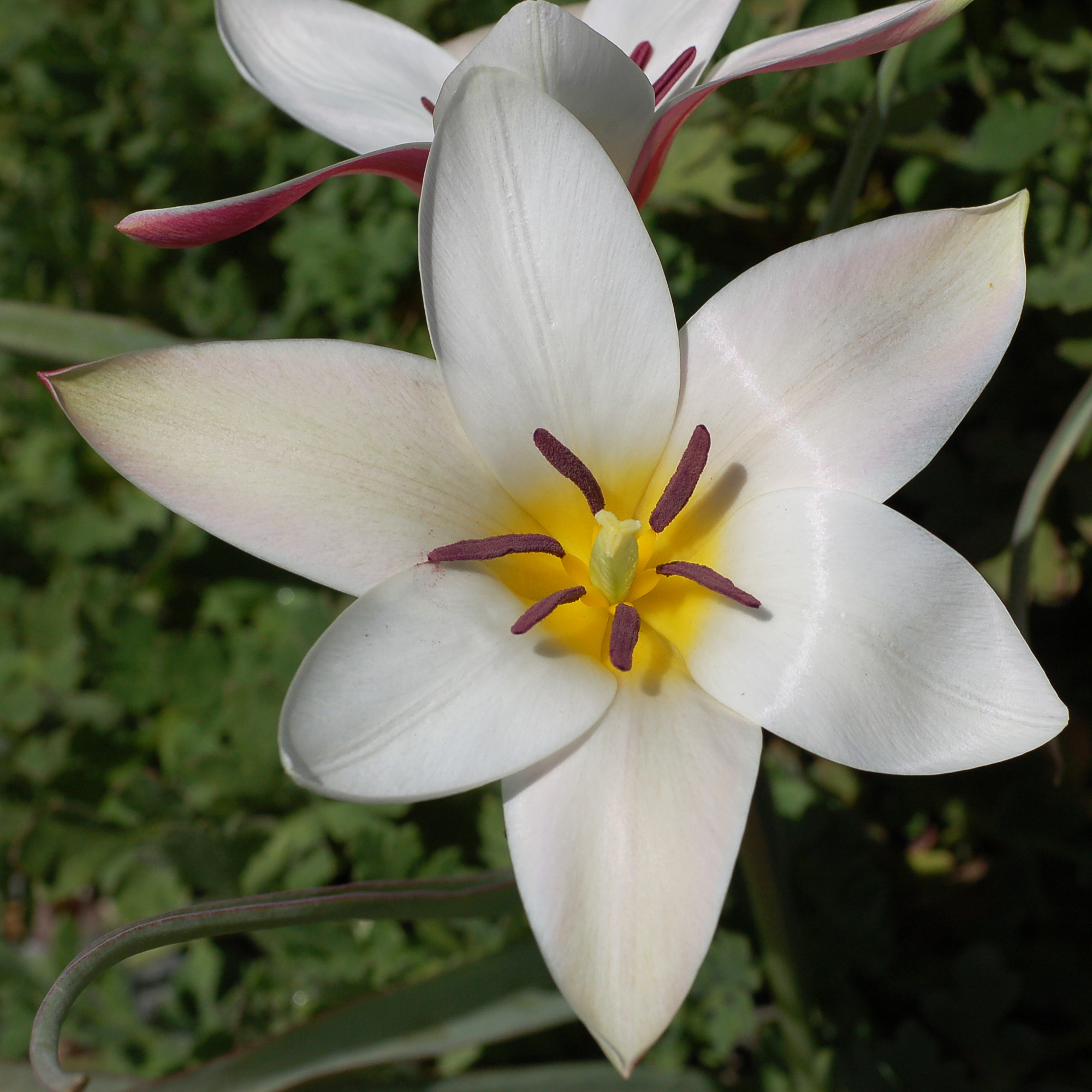
A tulip's actinomorphic flower with three of both petals and sepals, similar enough to be considered tepals

Petals are usually surrounded by an outer whorl of modified leaves called sepals, that collectively form the calyx and lie just beneath the corolla. The calyx and the corolla together make up the perianth, the non-reproductive portion of a flower. When the petals and sepals of a flower are difficult to distinguish, they are collectively called tepals (e.g. Aloe and Tulipa species). Conversely, genera such as Rosa and Phaseolus have well-distinguished sepals and petals. When the undifferentiated tepals resemble petals, they are referred to as "petaloid", as in petaloid monocots, orders of monocots with brightly coloured tepals. Since they include Liliales, an alternative name is lilioid monocots.

== Variations ==
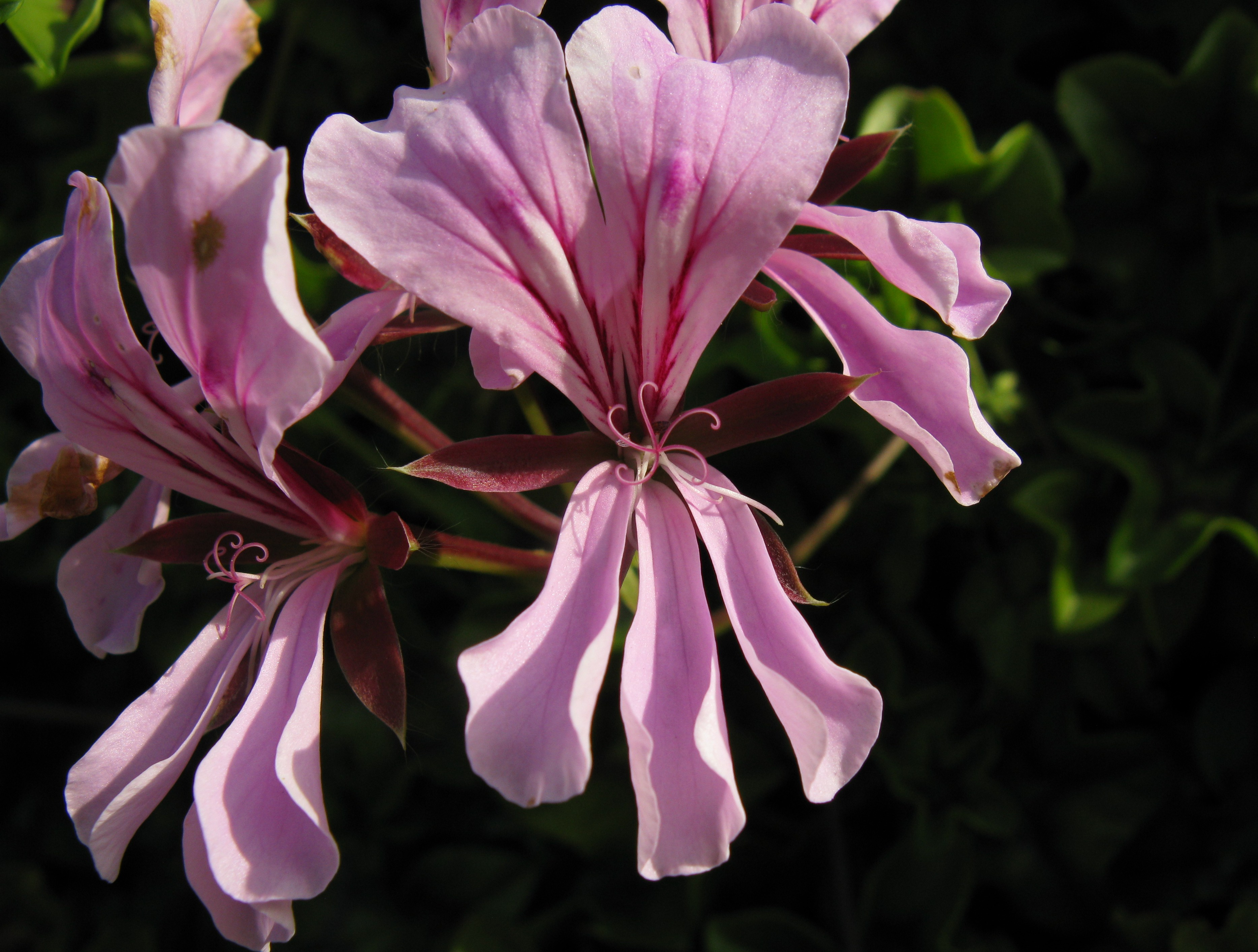
Pelargonium peltatum flowers resemble those of geraniums, but are conspicuously zygomorphic.

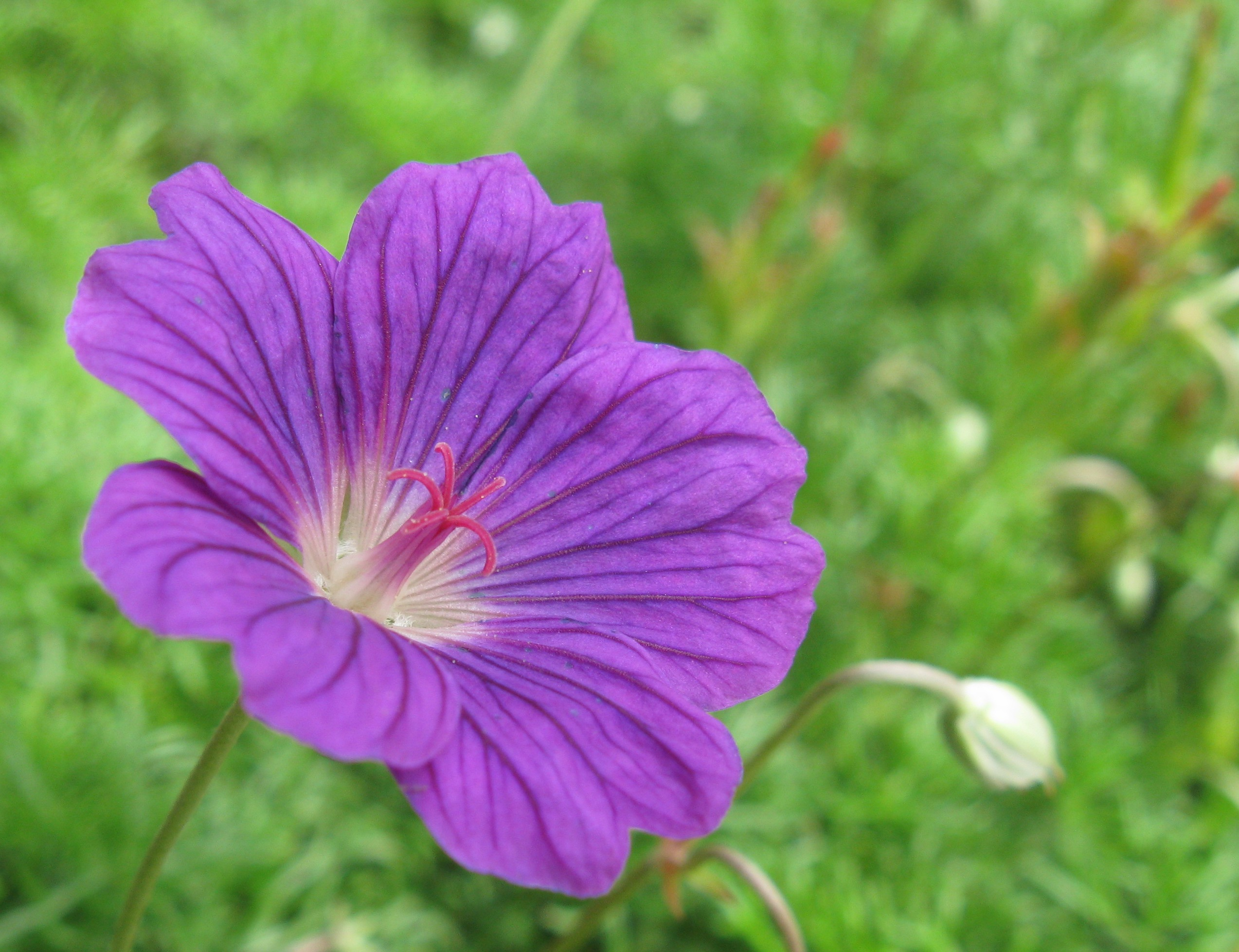
Geranium incanum, with an actinomorphic flower typical of the genus

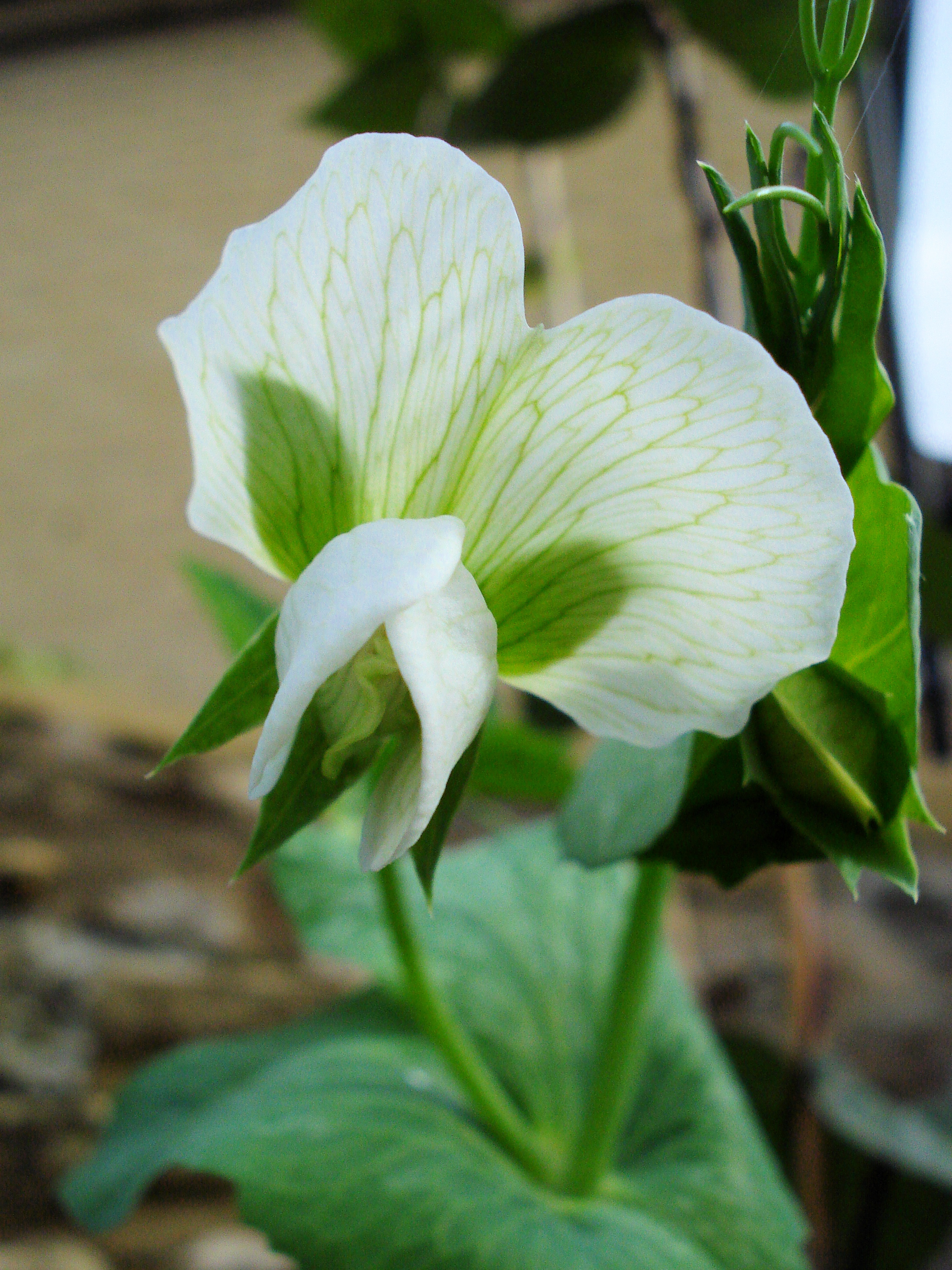
The white flower of Pisum sativum (the garden pea) an example of a zygomorphic flower

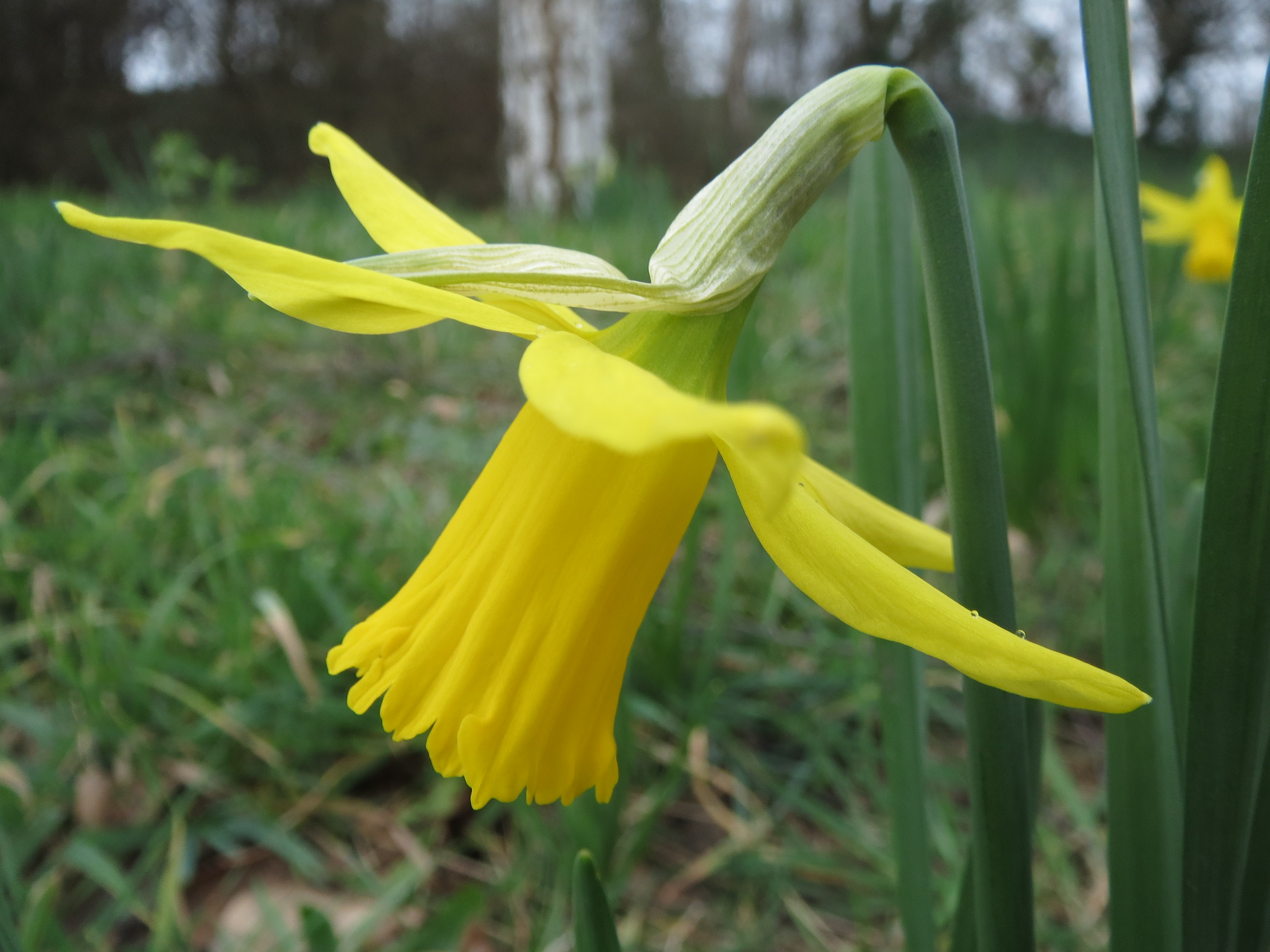
Narcissus pseudonarcissus showing (from bend to tip of flower) spathe, floral cup, tepals, and corona

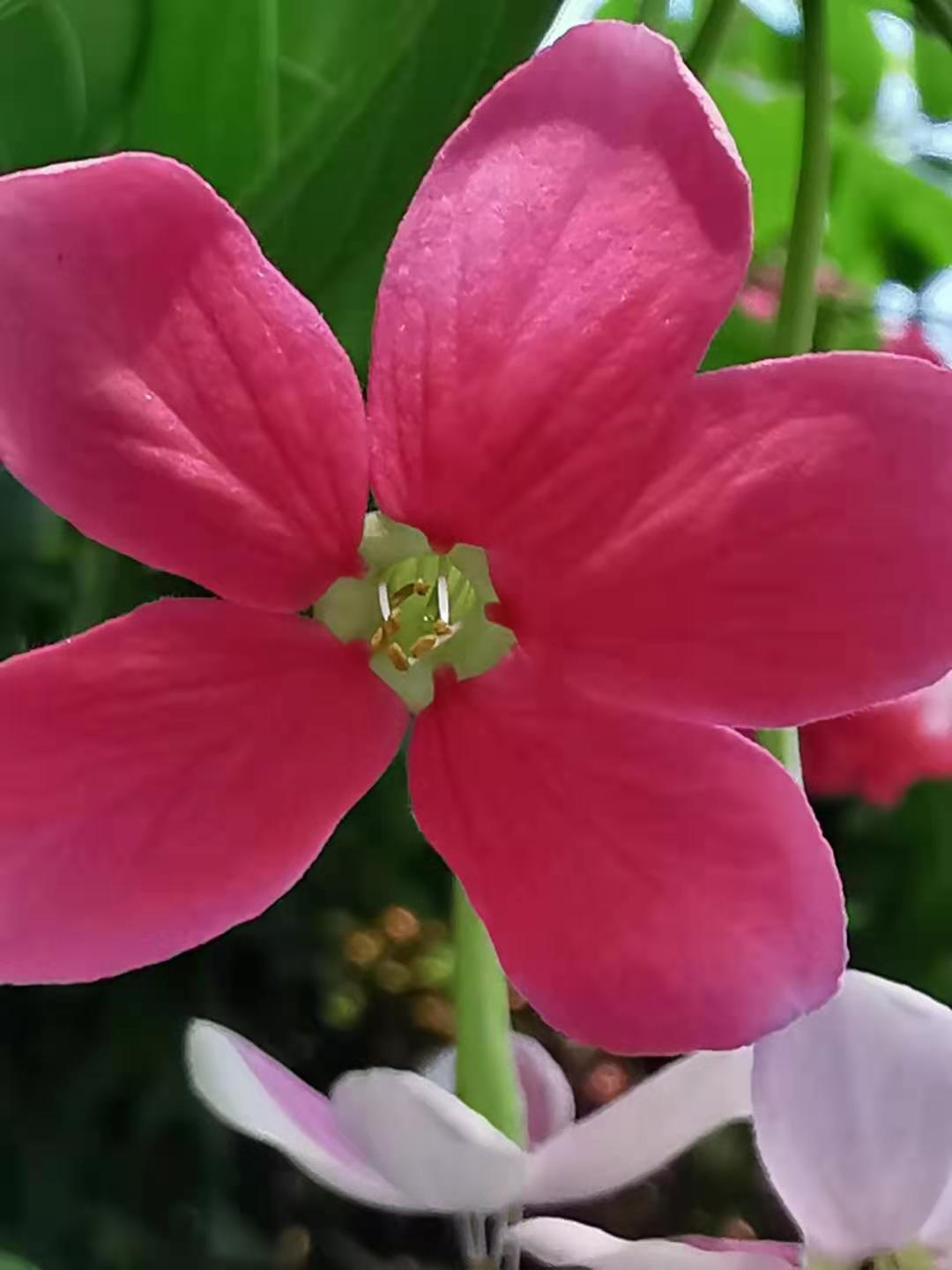
Combretum indicum

Petals can differ dramatically in different species. The number of petals in a flower may hold clues to a plant's classification. For example, flowers on eudicots (the largest group of dicots) most frequently have four or five petals while flowers on monocots have three or six petals, although there are many exceptions to this rule.

The petal whorl or corolla may be either radially or bilaterally symmetrical. If all of the petals are essentially identical in size and shape, the flower is said to be regular or actinomorphic (meaning "ray-formed"). Many flowers are symmetrical in only one plane (i.e., symmetry is bilateral) and are termed irregular or zygomorphic (meaning "yoke-" or "pair-formed"). In irregular flowers, other floral parts may be modified from the regular form, but the petals show the greatest deviation from radial symmetry. Examples of zygomorphic flowers may be seen in orchids and members of the pea family.

In many plants of the aster family such as the sunflower, Helianthus annuus, the circumference of the flower head is composed of ray florets. Each ray floret is anatomically an individual flower with a single large petal. Florets in the centre of the disc typically have no or very reduced petals. In some plants such as Narcissus, the lower part of the petals or tepals are fused to form a floral cup (hypanthium) above the ovary, and from which the petals proper extend.

A petal often consists of two parts: the upper broader part, similar to a leaf blade, also called the blade; and the lower narrower part, similar to a leaf petiole, called the claw, separated from each other at the limb. Claws are distinctly developed in petals of some flowers of the family Brassicaceae, such as Erysimum cheiri.

The inception and further development of petals show a great variety of patterns. Petals of different species of plants vary greatly in colour or colour pattern, both in visible light and in ultraviolet. Such patterns often function as guides to pollinators and are variously known as nectar guides, pollen guides, and floral guides.

== Genetics ==
The genetics behind the formation of petals, in accordance with the ABC model of flower development, are that sepals, petals, stamens, and carpels are modified versions of each other. It appears that the mechanisms to form petals evolved very few times (perhaps only once), rather than evolving repeatedly from stamens.

== Significance of pollination ==
Pollination is an important step in the sexual reproduction of higher plants. Pollen is produced by the male flower or by the male organs of hermaphroditic flowers.

Pollen does not move on its own and thus requires wind or animal pollinators to disperse the pollen to the stigma of the same or nearby flowers. However, pollinators are rather selective in determining the flowers they choose to pollinate. This develops competition between flowers and as a result flowers must provide incentives to appeal to pollinators (unless the flower self-pollinates or is involved in wind pollination). Petals play a major role in competing to attract pollinators. Henceforth pollination dispersal could occur and the survival of many species of flowers could prolong.

== Types of pollination ==
=== Wind pollination ===
The flowers of wind-pollinated plants, such as the grasses, often have small, dull petals and produce little or no scent. Some examples are apetalous, having no petals at all. Flowers that depend on wind pollination will produce large amounts of pollen because most of the pollen scattered by the wind tends to not reach other flowers.

=== Attracting insects ===
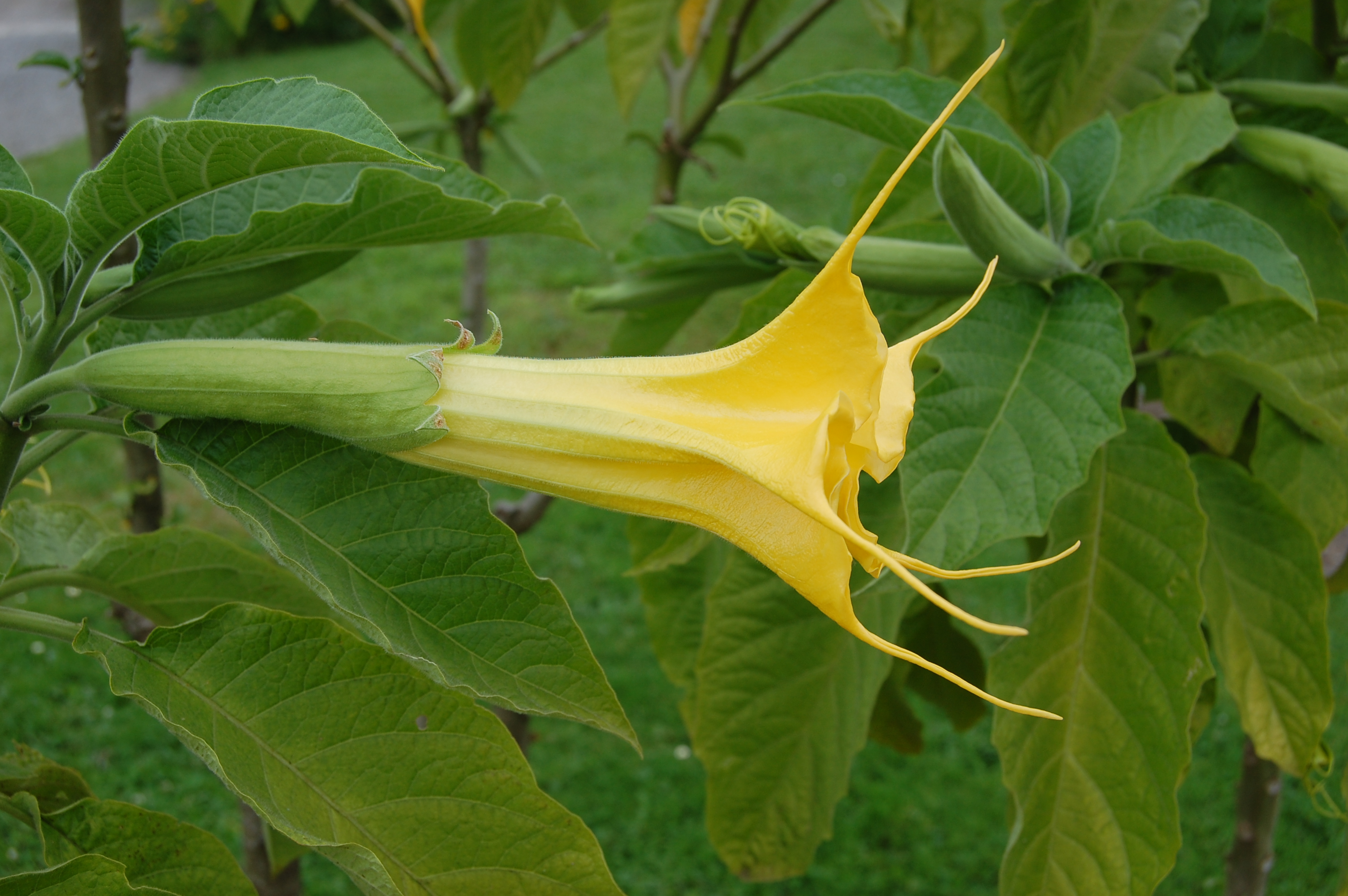
Campanulate corolla of Brugmansia aurea, emerging from tubular calyx and bearing long points

Flowers have various regulatory mechanisms to attract insects. One such helpful mechanism is the use of colour guiding marks. Insects such as the bee or butterfly can see the ultraviolet marks which are contained on these flowers, acting as an attractive mechanism which is not visible towards the human eye. Many flowers contain a variety of shapes acting to aid with the landing of the visiting insect and also influence the insect to brush against anthers and stigmas (parts of the flower). One such example of a flower is the pōhutukawa (Metrosideros excelsa), which acts to regulate colour in a different way. The pōhutukawa contains small petals also having bright large red clusters of stamens.

Another attractive mechanism for flowers is the use of scents which are highly attractive to humans. One such example is the rose. On the other hand, some flowers produce the smell of rotting meat and are attractive to insects such as flies. Darkness is another factor that flowers have adapted to as nighttime conditions limit vision and colour-perception. Fragrancy can be especially useful for flowers that are pollinated at night by moths and other flying insects.

=== Attracting birds ===
Flowers are also pollinated by birds and must be large and colourful to be visible against natural scenery. In New Zealand, such bird–pollinated native plants include: kowhai (Sophora species), flax (Phormium tenax) and kaka beak (Clianthus puniceus). Flowers adapt the mechanism on their petals to change colour in acting as a communicative mechanism for the bird to visit. An example is the tree fuchsia (Fuchsia excorticata), which are green when needing to be pollinated and turn red for the birds to stop coming and pollinating the flower.

=== Bat-pollinated flowers ===
Flowers can be pollinated by short-tailed bats. An example of this is the Dactylanthus taylorii. This plant has its home under the ground acting the role of a parasite on the roots of forest trees. The dactylanthus has only its flowers pointing to the surface and the flowers lack colour but have the advantage of containing much nectar and a strong scent. These act as a useful mechanism in attracting the bat.

== Bibliography ==
- Simpson, Michael G. (2011). Plant Systematics. Academic Press. ISBN 978-0-08-051404-8.
- Foster, Tony. "Botany Word of the Day". Phytography.
