= Cacyreus niebuhri =

Scientific classification
- Domain: Eukaryota
- Kingdom: Animalia
- Phylum: Arthropoda
- Class: Insecta
- Order: Lepidoptera
- Family: Lycaenidae
- Genus: Cacyreus
- Species: C. niebuhri

Binomial name
- Cacyreus niebuhri Larsen, 1982

Species of butterfly

Cacyreus niebuhri is a butterfly in the family Lycaenidae. It is found in Yemen.
