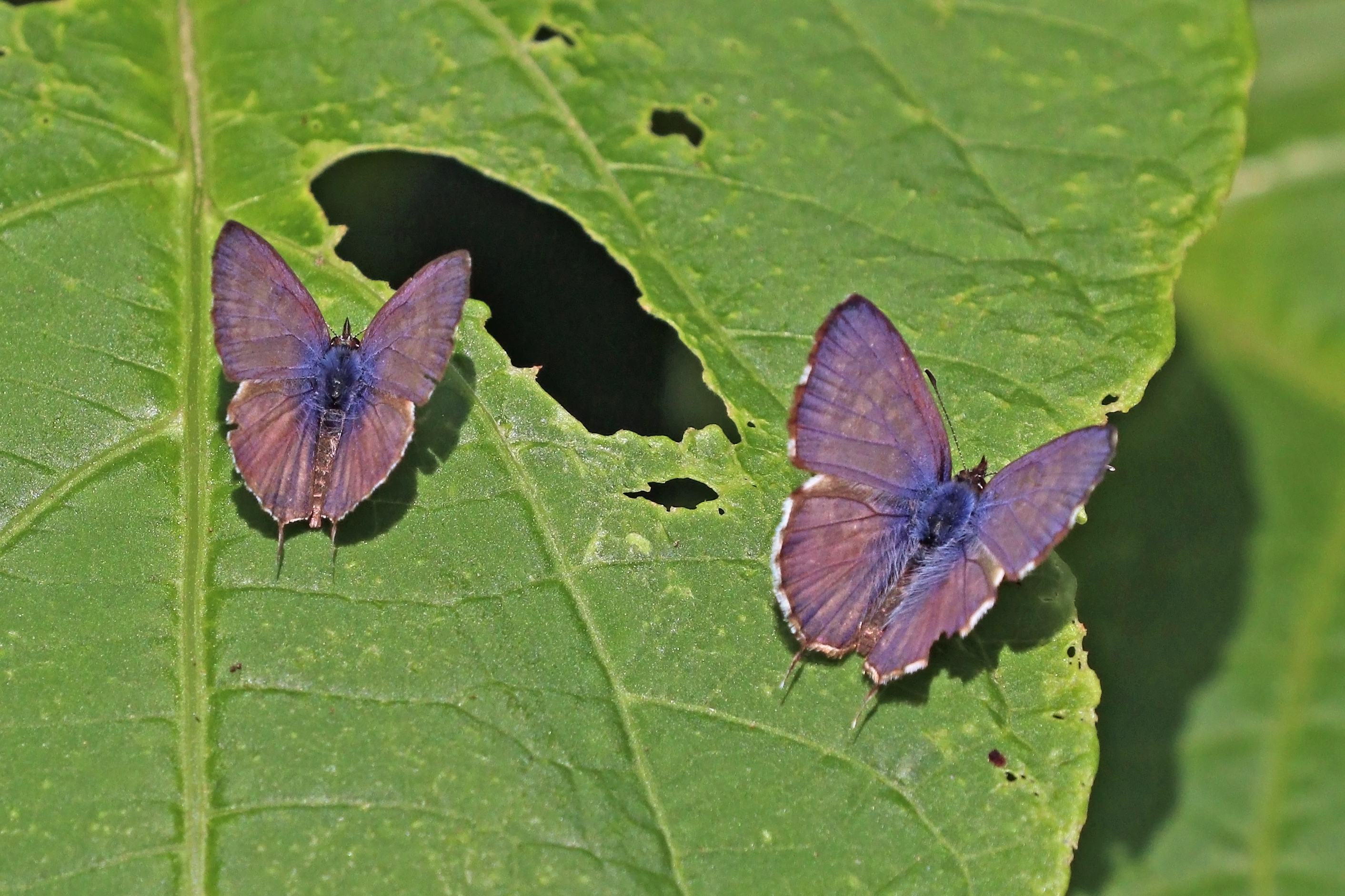

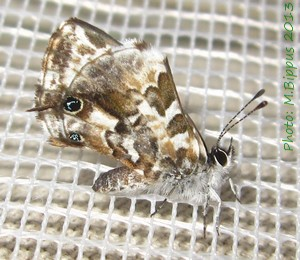
- males and female

Scientific classification
- Domain: Eukaryota
- Kingdom: Animalia
- Phylum: Arthropoda
- Class: Insecta
- Order: Lepidoptera
- Family: Lycaenidae
- Genus: Cacyreus
- Species: C. darius

Binomial name
- Cacyreus darius (Mabille, 1877)

Synonyms
- Lycaena darius Mabille, 1877

= Cacyreus darius =

Species of butterfly

Cacyreus darius is a butterfly in the family Lycaenidae. It is found on Madagascar, Mauritius, Réunion and the Comoros. The habitat consists of forests, forest margins and anthropogenic environments.

Known food plants of this species are Coleus species and Hyptis pectina (Lamiaceae)
