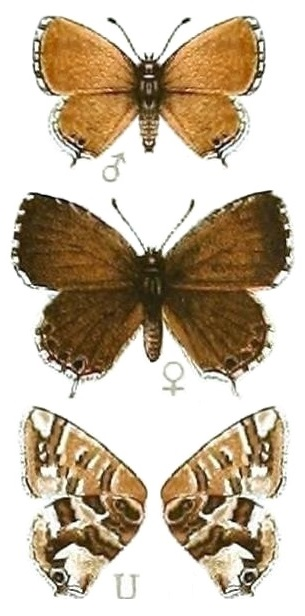

Scientific classification
- Domain: Eukaryota
- Kingdom: Animalia
- Phylum: Arthropoda
- Class: Insecta
- Order: Lepidoptera
- Family: Lycaenidae
- Genus: Cacyreus
- Species: C. tespis

Binomial name
- Cacyreus tespis (Herbst, 1804)

Synonyms
- Papilio tespis Herbst, 1804; Papilio palemon Stoll, 1782; Cupido palemon var. fracta Grünberg, 1911; Cacyreus palemon f. ecaudata Stempffer, 1950; Cacyreus palemon ghimirra Talbot, 1935

= Cacyreus tespis =

Water bronze

Species of butterfly

Cacyreus tespis, the water bronze or water blue, is a butterfly of the family Lycaenidae. It is found from South Africa to Ethiopia.

The wingspan is 15–25 mm for males and 17–25 mm for females. Adults are on wing year-round in warmer areas, but usually from August to May. At higher altitudes adults are on wing in December and January.

The larvae feed on the buds and green seeds of Geranium and Pelargonium species.

== Subspecies ==
- Cacyreus tespis tespis – Uganda, Kenya, Tanzania, Democratic Republic of the Congo: Kivu and Maniema, Rwanda, Burundi, Zambia, Mozambique, eastern Zimbabwe, Eswatini, Lesotho, South Africa: Limpopo, Mpumalanga, North West, Gauteng, Free State, KwaZulu-Natal, Eastern Cape, Western Cape and Northern Cape provinces
- Cacyreus tespis ghimirra Talbot, 1935 – highlands of Ethiopia
