= Cacyreus dicksoni =

Scientific classification
- Kingdom: Animalia
- Phylum: Arthropoda
- Class: Insecta
- Order: Lepidoptera
- Family: Lycaenidae
- Genus: Cacyreus
- Species: C. dicksoni

Binomial name
- Cacyreus dicksoni Pennington, 1962

Species of butterfly

Cacyreus dicksoni, the Dickson's geranium bronze, is a butterfly of the family Lycaenidae. It is found from South Africa, from the West Cape along the coast to the North Cape.

The wingspan is 16–24 mm for males and 19–25 mm for females. Adults are on wing from August to March.
